= 2020 Pacific hurricane season =

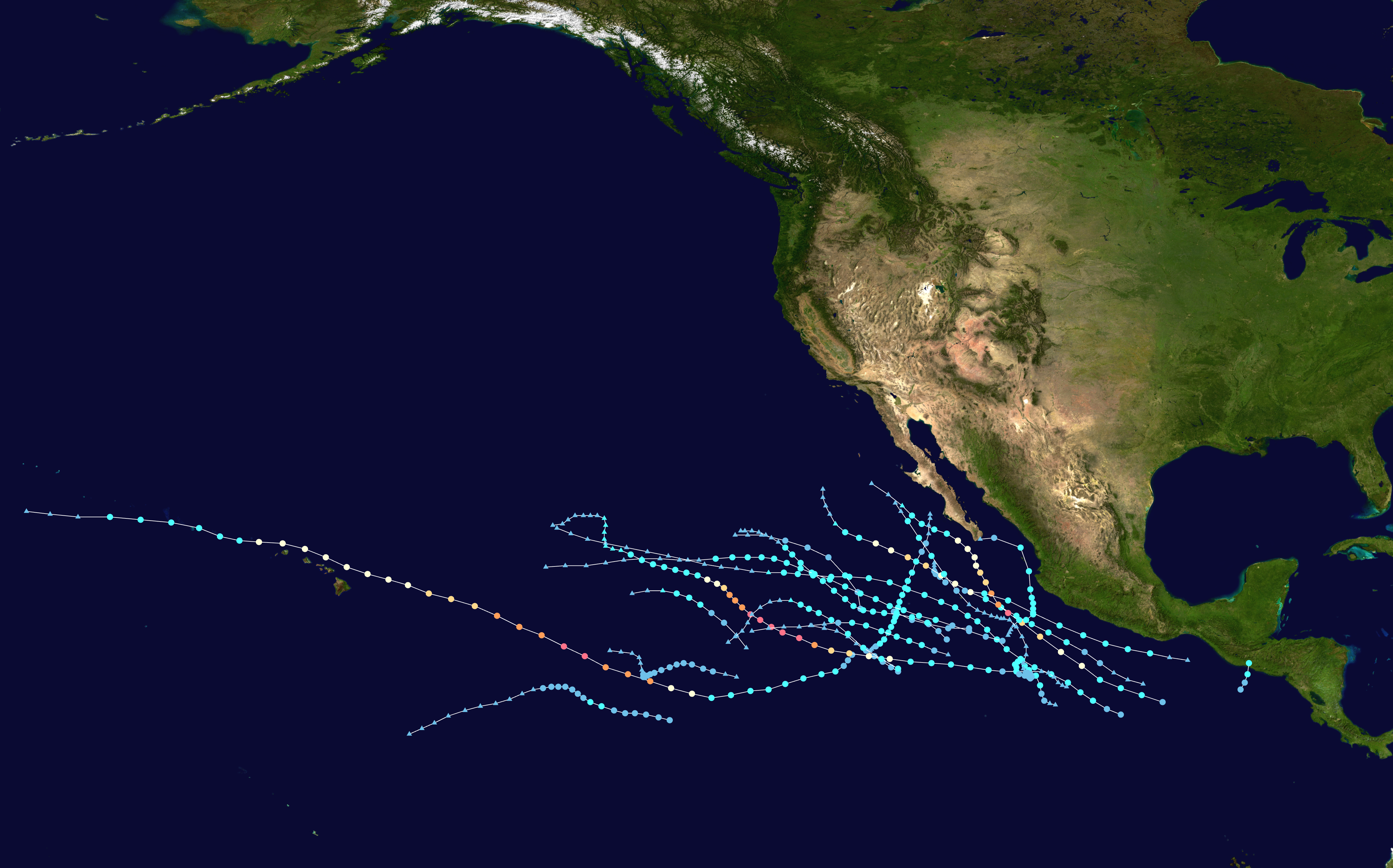
- Season summary map

Seasonal boundaries
- First system formed: April 25, 2020
- Last system dissipated: November 19, 2020

Strongest storm
- Name: Marie
  - Maximum winds: 140 mph (220 km/h) (1-minute sustained)
  - Lowest pressure: 945 mbar (hPa; 27.91 inHg)

Seasonal statistics
- Total depressions: 21
- Total storms: 17
- Hurricanes: 4
- Major hurricanes (Cat. 3+): 3
- ACE: 77.3
- Total fatalities: 47 total
- Total damage: ≥ $301.4 million (2020 USD)

Related articles
- Timeline of the 2020 Pacific hurricane season; 2020 Atlantic hurricane season; 2020 Pacific typhoon season; 2020 North Indian Ocean cyclone season

The 2020 Pacific hurricane season was a near average Pacific hurricane season in terms of named storms, featuring 17 (including one unnamed tropical storm which was operationally classified as a tropical depression), but well below average season for hurricanes and major hurricanes, with only 4 hurricanes and 3 major hurricanes forming. Additionally, no tropical cyclones formed in the Central Pacific basin for the first time since 2017. The season officially began on May 15 in the East Pacific Ocean (east of 140°W), and on June 1 in the Central Pacific (from 140°W to the International Date Line, north of the equator; they both ended on November 30. These dates conventionally delimit the period of each year when most tropical cyclones form in the respective regions. However, the formation of tropical cyclones is possible at any time of the year, as illustrated in 2020 by the formation of the season's first system, Tropical Depression One-E, on April 25. This was the earliest formation of a tropical cyclone on record in the eastern Pacific basin proper. The final system of the season was Tropical Storm Polo, which dissipated on November 19.

The most significant storms of the season were Tropical Storm Amanda and Hurricane Genevieve. Amanda developed near Central America in late May and struck Guatemala, causing widespread damage in neighboring El Salvador and killing 40 people amid the COVID-19 pandemic in the latter country. Genevieve passed closely to the tip of the Baja California Peninsula in August, bringing hurricane-force winds and heavy rainfall, killing six and causing an estimated $50 million in damage. Otherwise, impact from other storms was minimal. In late July, Hurricane Douglas passed close to Hawaii, with its weak southern eyewall crossing Oahu, causing minor effects. The remnant moisture of Tropical Storm Fausto contributed to the thunderstorms that brought about the August 2020 California lightning wildfires, and the remnants of Genevieve dropped heavy rainfall in Arizona and Southern California. Tropical Storm Hernan moved very near the coast of southwestern Mexico, causing an additional fatality and several millions of dollars' worth of damage. Collectively, the tropical cyclones of this season caused about US$301.4 million in damage and 47 deaths.

== Seasonal forecasts ==
Record		Named storms	Hurricanes	Major hurricanes	Ref
Average (1981–2010):		15.4	7.6	3.2	
Record high activity:		27	16†	11	
Record low activity:		8†	3	0†	
Date	Source	Named storms	Hurricanes	Major hurricanes	Ref
May 20, 2020	SMN	15–18	8–10	4–5	
May 21, 2020	NOAA	11–18	5–10	1–5	
	Area	Named storms	Hurricanes	Major hurricanes	Ref
Actual activity:	EPAC	17	4	3	
Actual activity:	CPAC	0	0	0	
Actual combined activity:		17	4	3	
* May 15–November 30 only † Most recent of several such occurrences. (See all)

On May 20, 2020, the Servicio Meteorológico Nacional (SMN) issued its forecast for the season, predicting a total of 15–18 named storms, 8–10 hurricanes, and 4–5 major hurricanes to develop. The next day, the National Oceanic and Atmospheric Administration (NOAA) issued their outlook, calling for a below-normal to near-normal season with 11–18 named storms, 5–10 hurricanes, 1–5 major hurricanes, and an accumulated cyclone energy index of 60% to 135% of the median. Factors they expected to reduce activity were near- or below-average sea surface temperatures across the eastern Pacific and the El Niño–Southern Oscillation remaining in the neutral phase, with the possibility of a La Niña developing.

== Seasonal summary ==
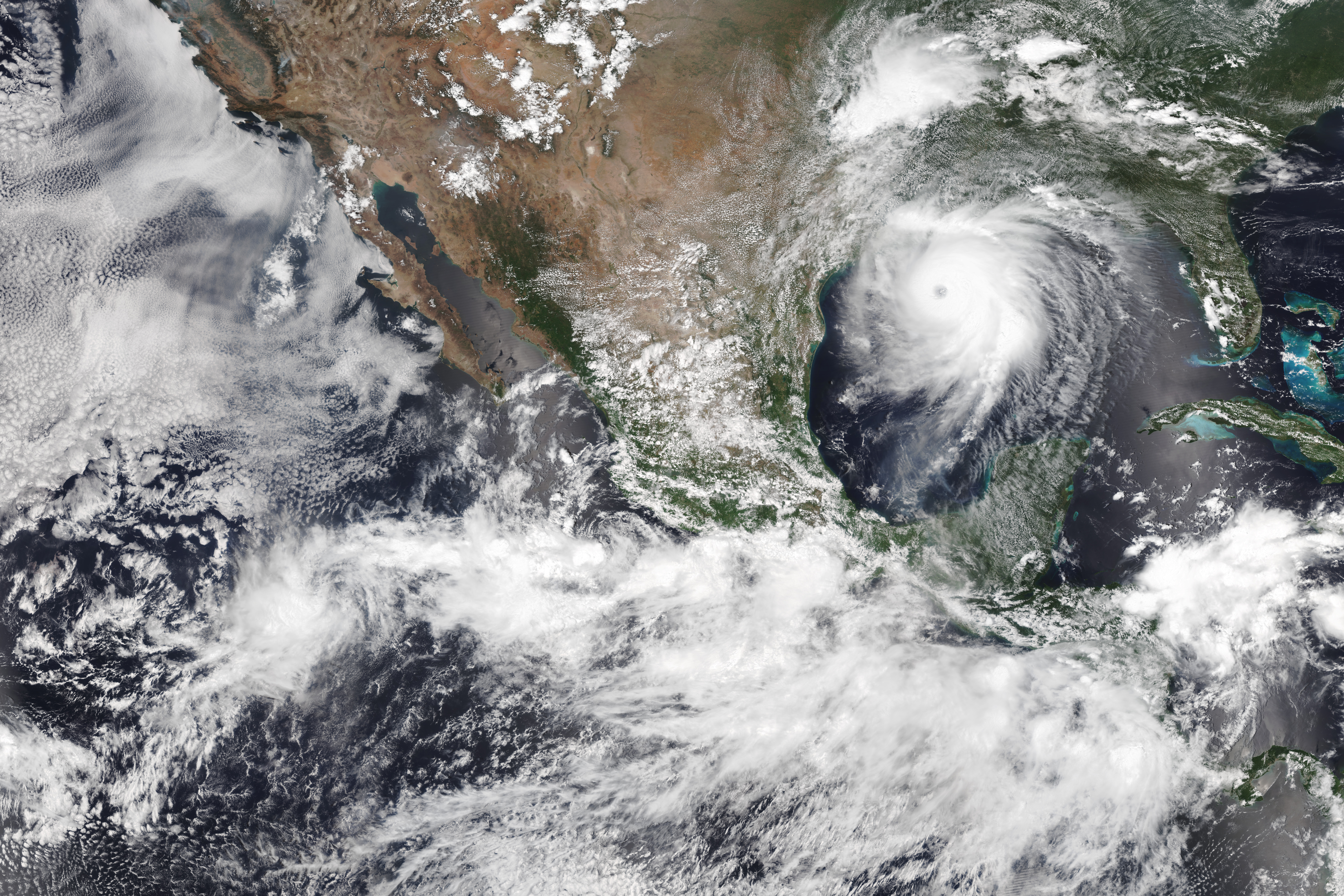
Tropical Storms Iselle (left) and Hernan (center) on August 26, with Hurricane Laura in the North Atlantic basin in the top right

Although the hurricane season in the eastern Pacific did not officially begin until May 15, and on June 1 in the central Pacific, activity this year began several weeks prior with the formation of Tropical Depression One-E on April 25. This marked the earliest formation of a tropical cyclone on record in the eastern Pacific basin, surpassing 2017's Tropical Storm Adrian. Among relatively unfavorable conditions, the depression soon dissipated without developing further, and activity would not resume in the basin until nearly a month later with the formation of Tropical Depression Two-E near the coast of Guatemala on May 30. This system would later become Tropical Storm Amanda, the first named storm of the season and one of the worst natural disasters in El Salvador in around two decades. Not for nearly another month after Amanda, Tropical Depression Three-E would briefly become Tropical Storm Boris on June 25 well out to sea before weakening in the Central Pacific basin. A short-lived tropical depression would form near Baja California Sur just 2 days after Boris's dissipation and quickly weaken. Moving into July, Tropical Storm Cristina formed on July 6 and slowly intensified to a peak intensity of 70 miles per hour (110 km/h), barely missing hurricane status. Activity continued as yet another tropical depression, Six-E, formed on July 13 but quickly dissipated among the unfavorable conditions unfolding in the basin. Two more tropical systems formed in mid July, Tropical Depression Seven-E and Tropical Storm Douglas. Seven-E was short lived and although it did gain tropical storm intensity, it was operationally left unnamed. Douglas strengthened into the first hurricane of the season at 15:00 UTC on July 22, marking the fourth–latest date any season had gone without a hurricane. Douglas would later strengthen into a Category 4 hurricane and brush Hawaii with rain and gusty winds.

Least intense Pacific hurricane seasons
Rank	Season	ACE value
1	1977	22.3
2	2010	51.2
3	2007	51.6
4	1996	53.9
5	2003	56.6
6	1979	57.4
7	2004	71.1
8	1981	72.8
9	2013	74.8
10	2020	77.3

A burst of activity occurred in early August, with a tropical wave south of Mexico evolving into Tropical Storm Elida on August 9, later to become the second hurricane of the season. Elida was generally short lived, but with the formation of Tropical Depression Ten-E, Tropical Storm Fausto, and Hurricane Genevieve activity continued. Genevieve later became the second major hurricane of the season before briefly effecting Baja California Sur as a minimal hurricane. Two additional tropical cyclones, Tropical Storms Hernan and Iselle, formed in late August. Both were generally weak and did not make landfall, although the former brought heavy flooding and mudslides to western Mexico. Later, on September 5, the remnants of former Atlantic tropical cyclone Nana reformed into a new cyclone in the Pacific named Julio. After Julio, Karina and Lowell formed. Near the end of September, Hurricane Marie formed and rapidly intensified up to Category 4 strength before weakening out to sea, becoming the strongest storm of the season. The only October storm of the season, Norbert, lasted for 10 days. After almost a month of inactivity, Odalys formed on November 3, and dissipated three days later without affecting land. Tropical Storm Polo formed close to the end of the season, but it was also short-lived and weak.

The Accumulated Cyclone Energy (ACE) index for the 2020 Pacific hurricane season (Eastern Pacific and Central Pacific combined) as calculated by Colorado State University using data from the National Hurricane Center was 77.3 units. (Note: The total represents the sum of the squares of the maximum sustained wind speed (knots) for every (sub)tropical storm's intensity of over 33 knots (38 mph; 61 km/h), divided by 10,000 while they are above that threshold; therefore, tropical depressions are not included.) Broadly speaking, ACE is a measure of the power of a tropical or subtropical storm multiplied by the length of time it existed. It is only calculated for full advisories on specific tropical and subtropical systems reaching or exceeding wind speeds of 39 miles per hour (63 km/h).

== Systems ==
=== Tropical Depression One-E ===
- Tropical depression (SSHWS)
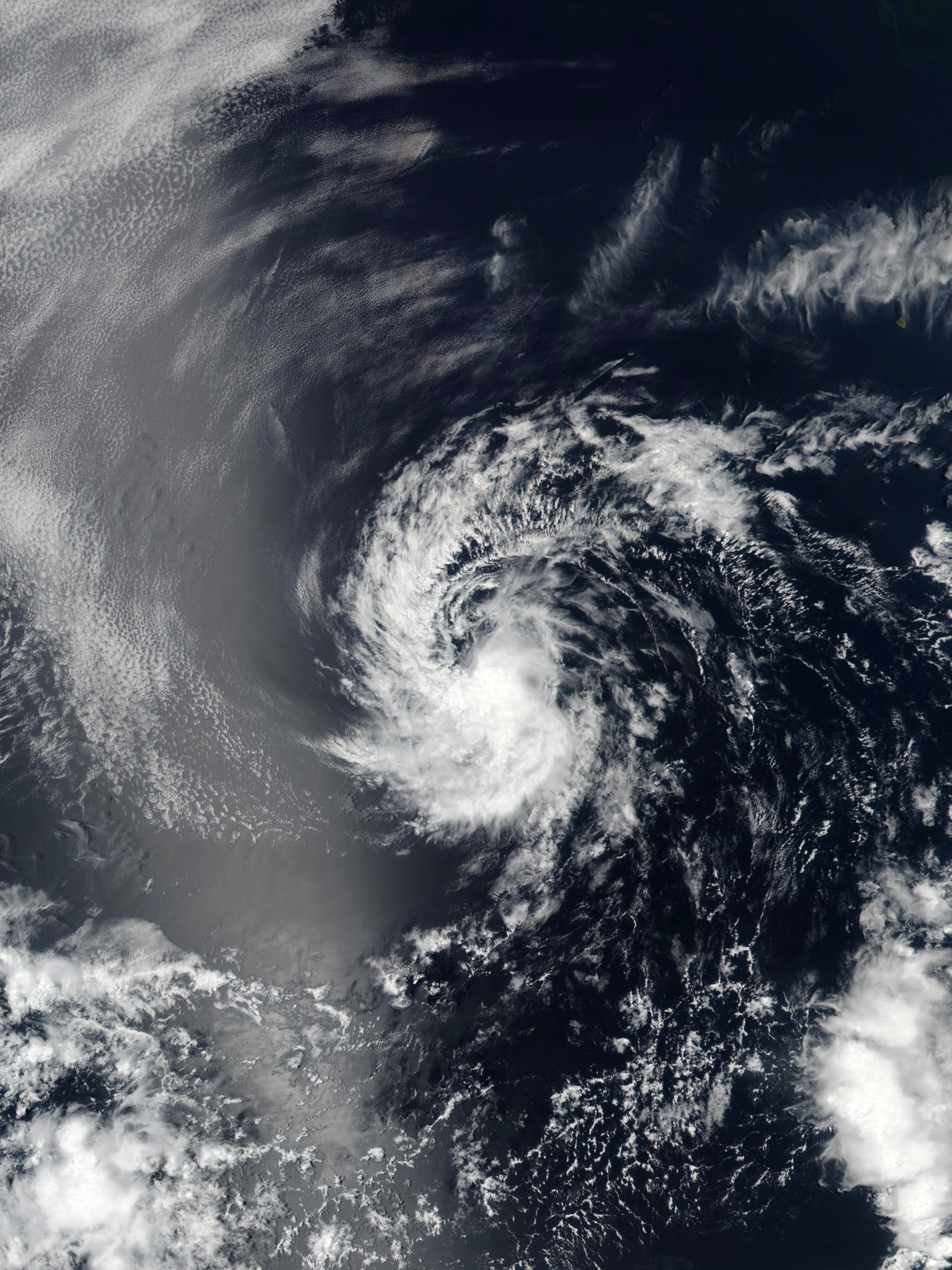
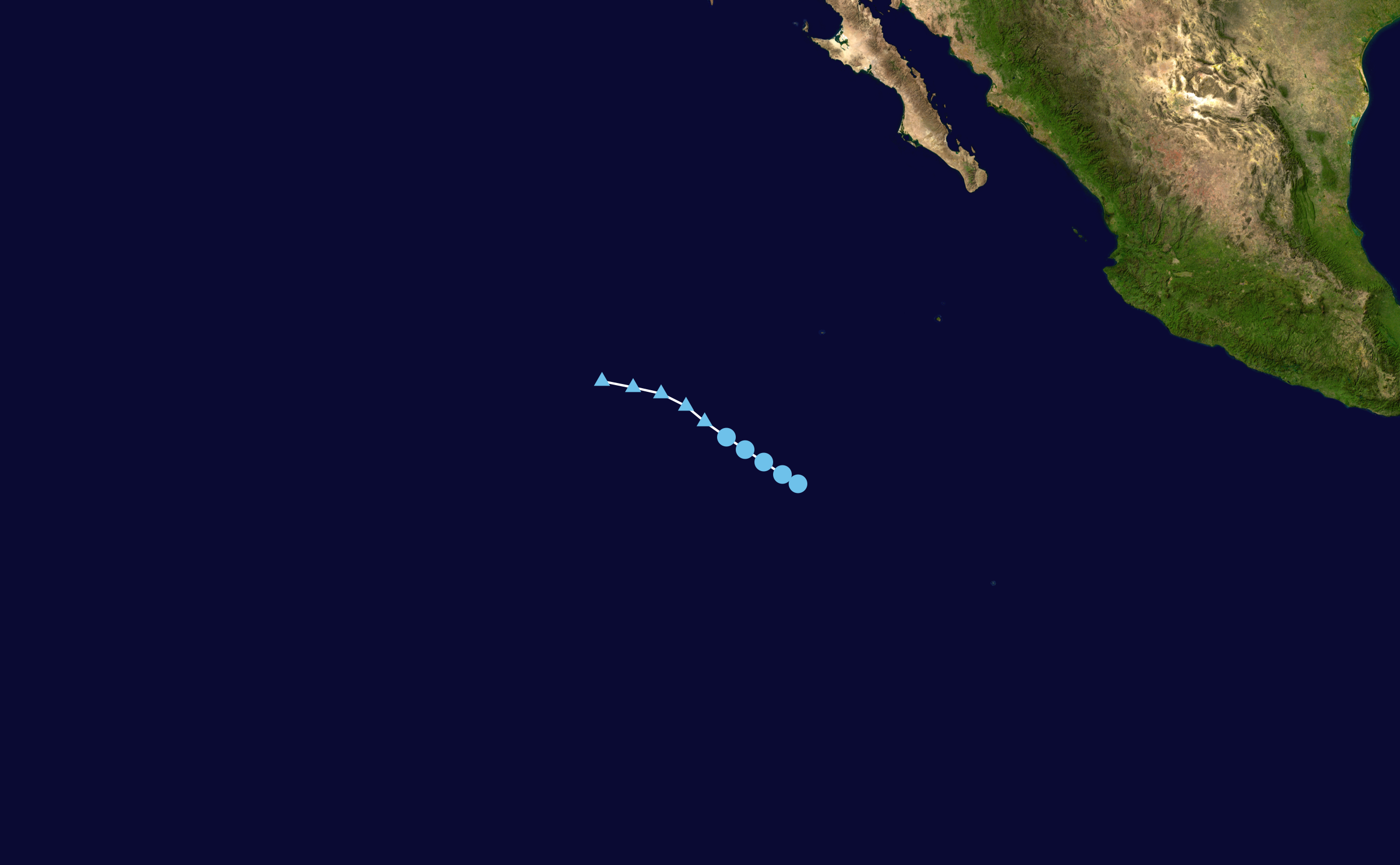
- Duration: April 25 – April 26
- Peak intensity: 35 mph (55 km/h) (1-min); 1006 mbar (hPa)

A disturbance developed within the Intertropical Convergence Zone (ITCZ) on April 17, aided by the passage of a convectively-coupled kelvin wave (CCKW) – an eastward-propagating area of enhanced thunderstorm activity near the equator. The disturbance moved westward within the ITCZ over the next several days, and after developing a well-defined center and organized convection, it was designated as Tropical Depression One-E at 06:00 UTC on April 25 about 805 mi (1,295 km) southwest of Baja California Sur. Moving northwestward, the depression retained organized deep convection until shortly after 00:00 UTC the next day. Dry air and westerly wind shear caused the depression to weaken and degenerate to a remnant low by 12:00 UTC. The remnant low turned west and opened up into a trough at 18:00 UTC on April 27.

=== Tropical Storm Amanda ===
- Tropical storm (SSHWS)
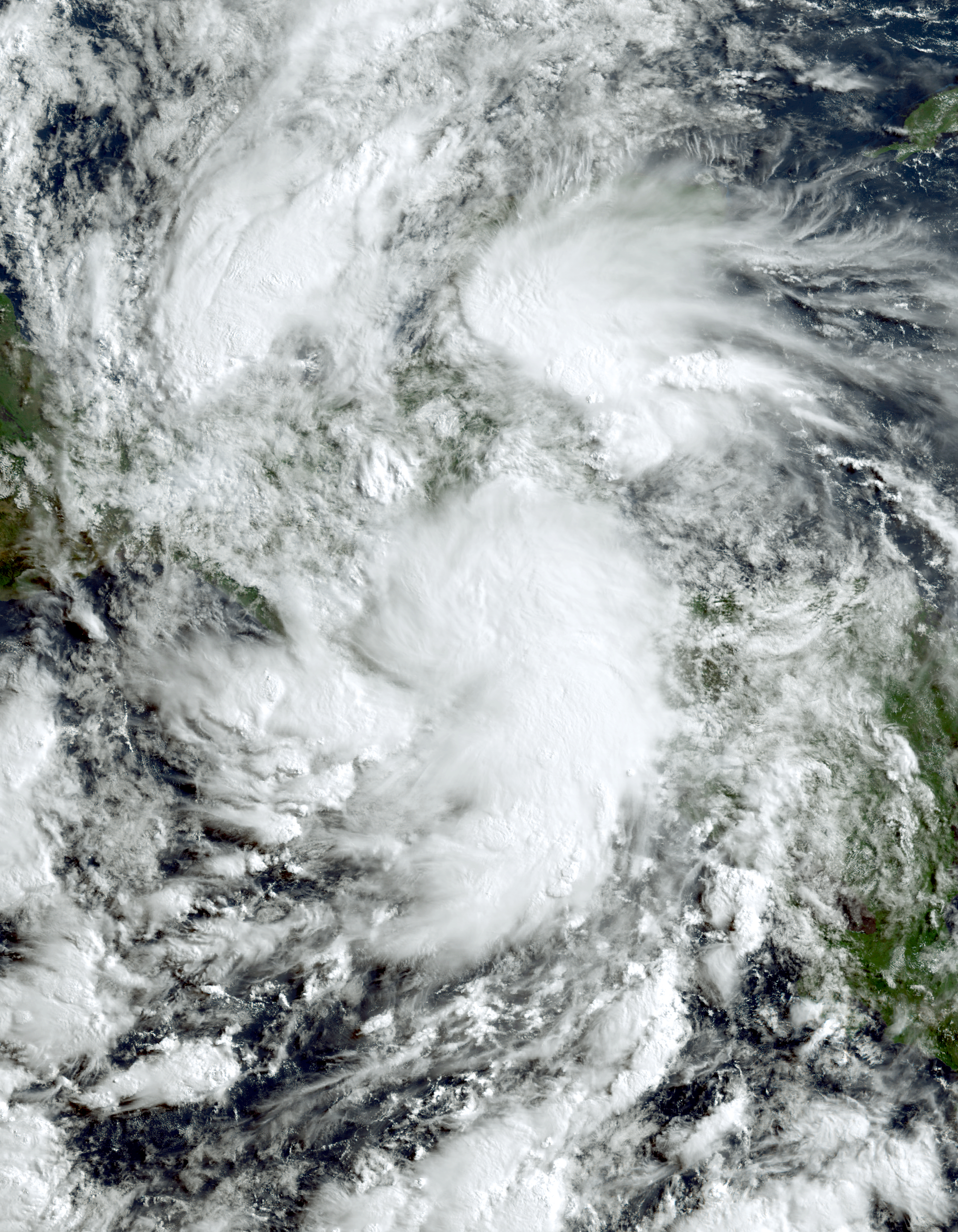
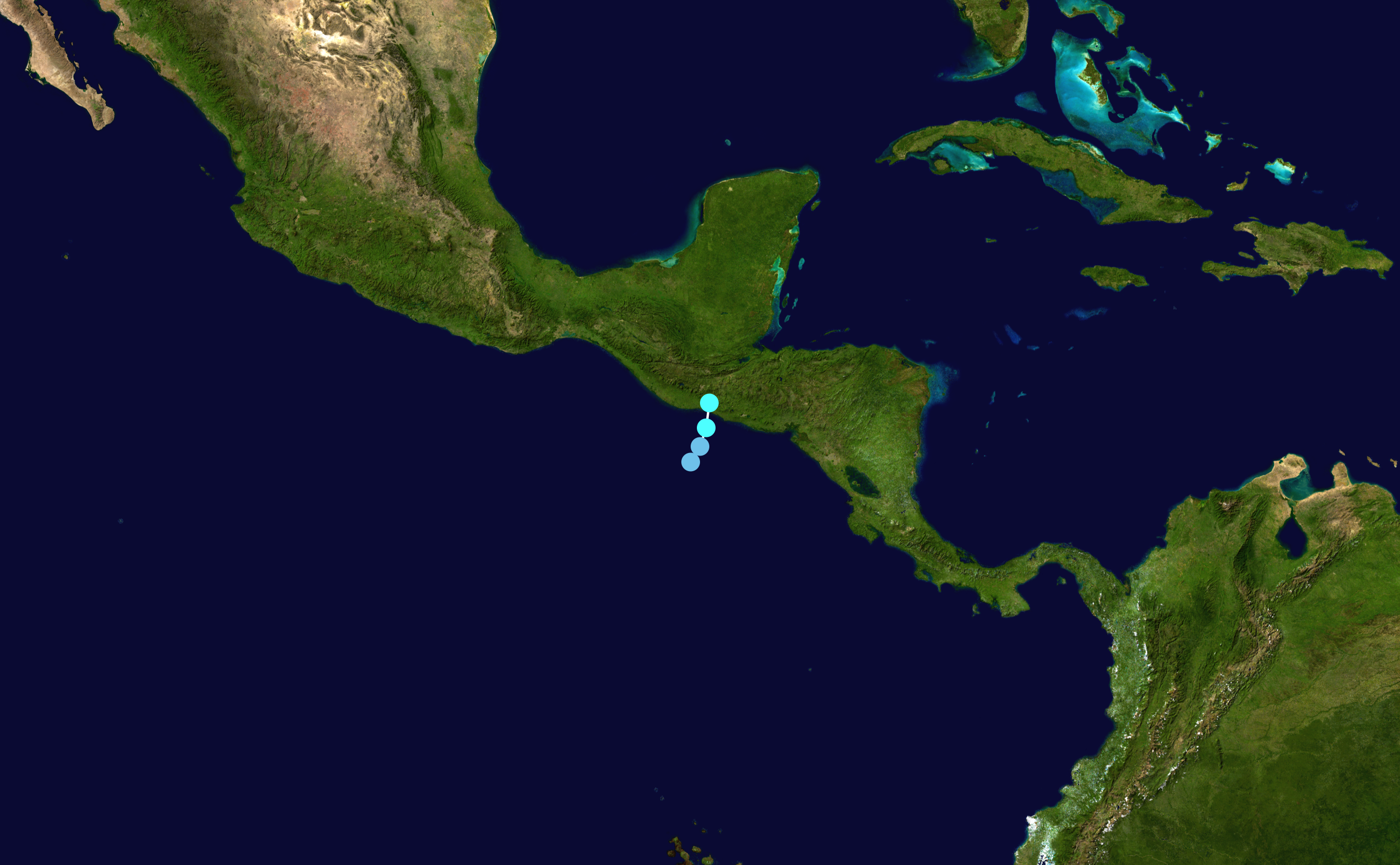
- Duration: May 30 – May 31
- Peak intensity: 40 mph (65 km/h) (1-min); 1003 mbar (hPa)

The combination of an upper level low over northeastern Mexico and a passing CCKW over the East Pacific caused an area of low pressure to form south of Guatemala and El Salvador on May 27. Two days later, the system interacted with a tropical wave that first originated from Africa on May 18. The conglomeration of these features led to the formation of a tropical depression around 18:00 UTC on May 30; it was positioned about 115 mi (185 km) south of Puerto San José, Escuintla. Moving northeastward around the periphery of a large cyclonic gyre over northern Central America, the compact depression continued to organize, strengthening into Tropical Storm Amanda at 06:00 UTC the next day. About four hours later, Amanda made landfall at peak intensity near Las Lisas, Santa Rosa. Amanda rapidly degenerated as it moved inland, with its center dissipating around 18:00 UTC. The remnants of the system moved northward into the Bay of Campeche and redeveloped into the Atlantic's Tropical Storm Cristobal.

In El Salvador, torrential rainfall caused significant damage along coastal cities in the country as rivers overflowed and swept away buildings. Amanda killed 14 people in El Salvador, of which at least six died due to flash flooding, and one died from a collapsed home. More than 900 homes were damaged across the country and 1,200 families were evacuated to 51 shelters across La Libertad, San Salvador, Sonsonate, and San Vicente. In the capital, San Salvador, 50 houses were destroyed and 23 vehicles fell into a sinkhole. El Salvador President Nayib Bukele declared a 15-day national state of emergency due to the storm. Movement restrictions in place for the COVID-19 pandemic were temporarily lifted to allow people to purchase medicines, while hardware stores were allowed to open with limited capacity so people could purchase equipment for repairs.

=== Tropical Storm Boris ===
- Tropical storm (SSHWS)
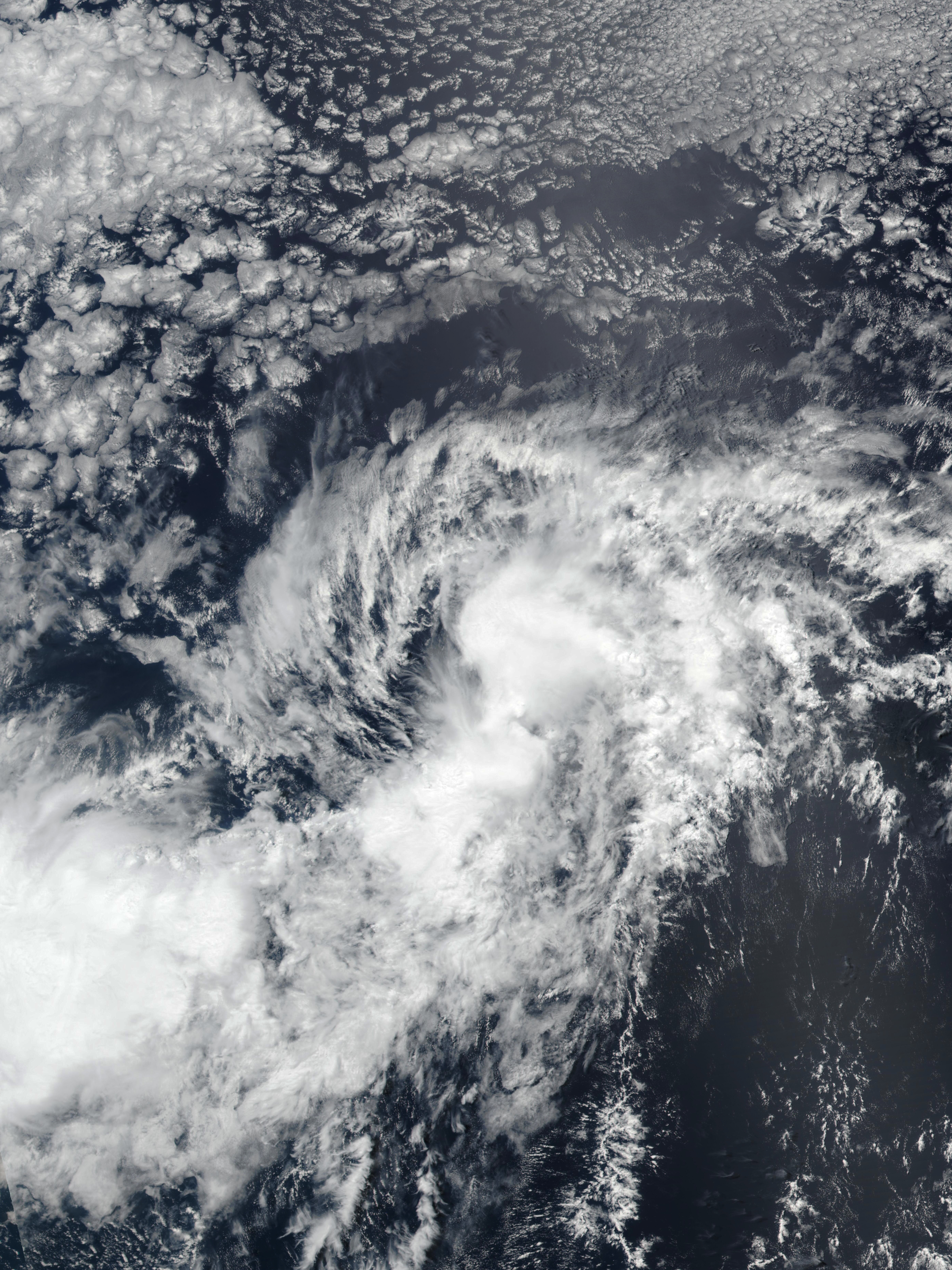
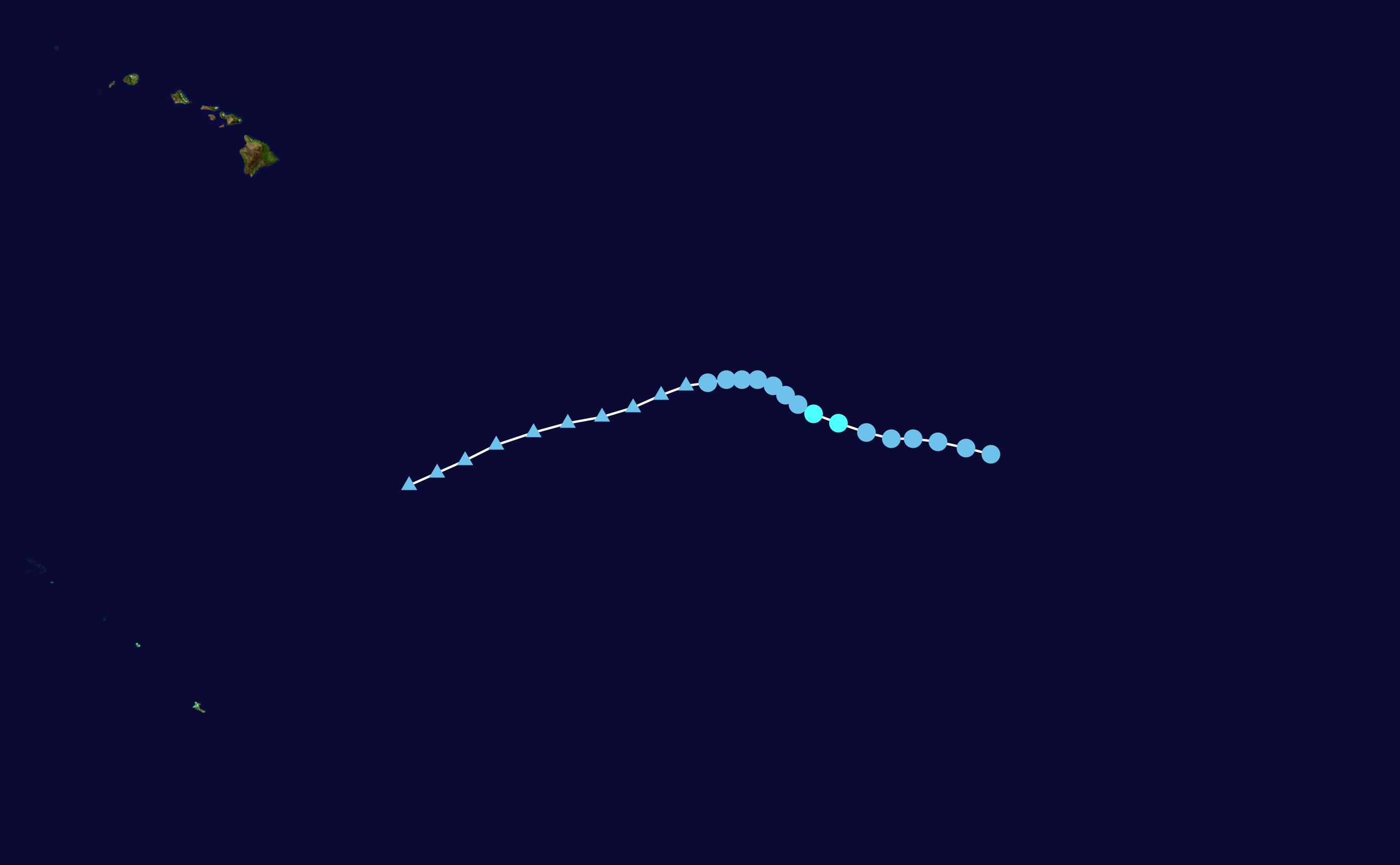
- Duration: June 24 – June 27
- Peak intensity: 40 mph (65 km/h) (1-min); 1005 mbar (hPa)

The interaction between a tropical wave, a preexisting area of disturbed weather, and the favorable phase of the Madden–Julian oscillation (MJO) led to the formation of a surface low late on June 23. Deep convection coalesced with this circulation over the ensuing hours, and a tropical depression developed around 06:00 UTC on June 24. The system struggled via the effects of nearby dry air and some wind shear as it moved west to west-northwest under the subtropical ridge. Nonetheless, it intensified into Tropical Storm Boris around 18:00 UTC on June 25 when deep convection was most prevalent. A further increase in upper-level winds prevented Boris from strengthening beyond minimal tropical storm intensity, and it instead weakened to a tropical depression again twelve hours later before crossing into the Central Pacific basin. All associated thunderstorm activity dissipated by June 28, and Boris degenerated to a remnant area of low pressure by 00:00 UTC that day. The post-tropical cyclone curved west-southwest and dissipated well south-southeast of the Hawaiian Islands on June 30.

=== Tropical Depression Four-E ===
- Tropical depression (SSHWS)
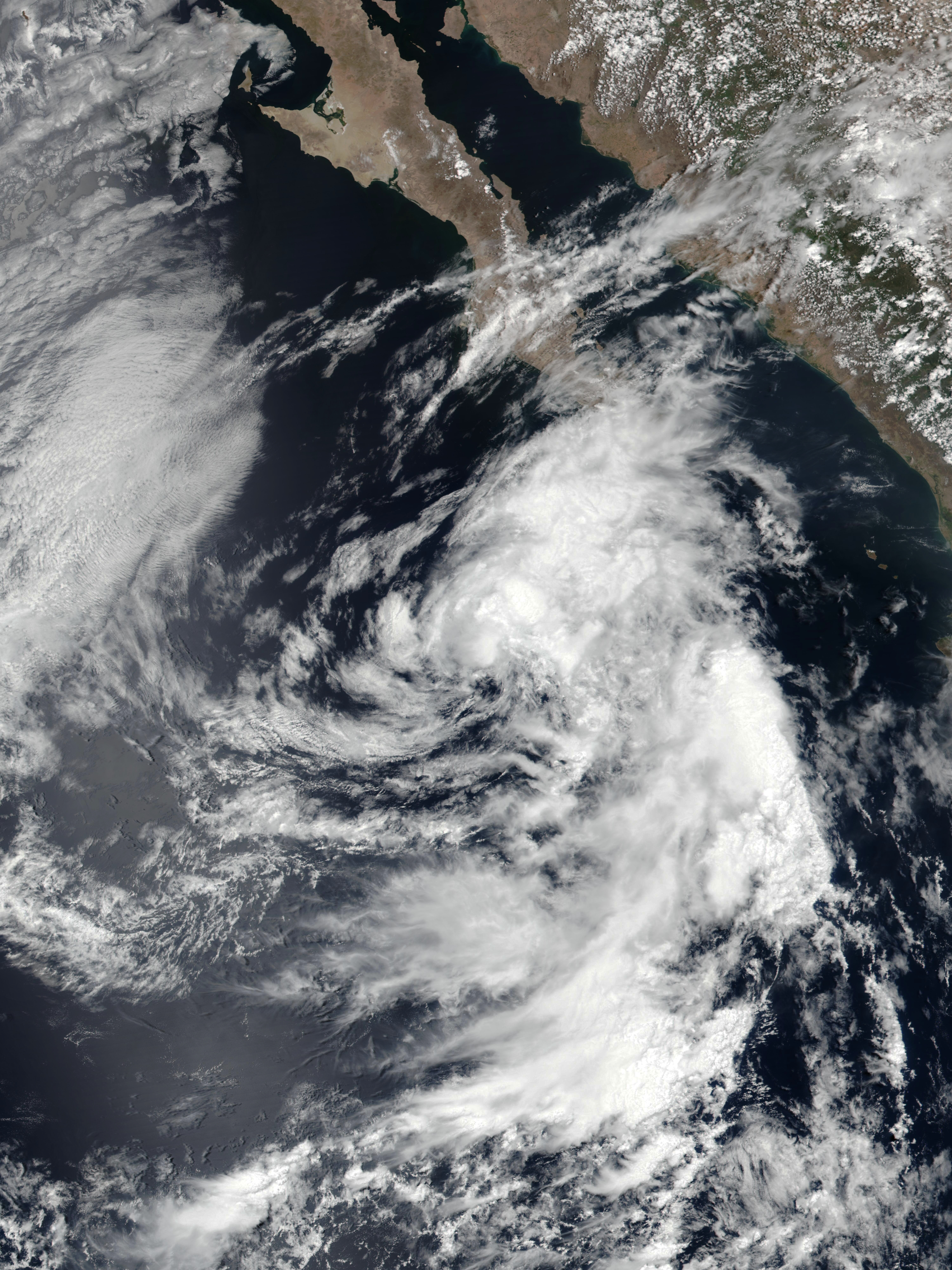
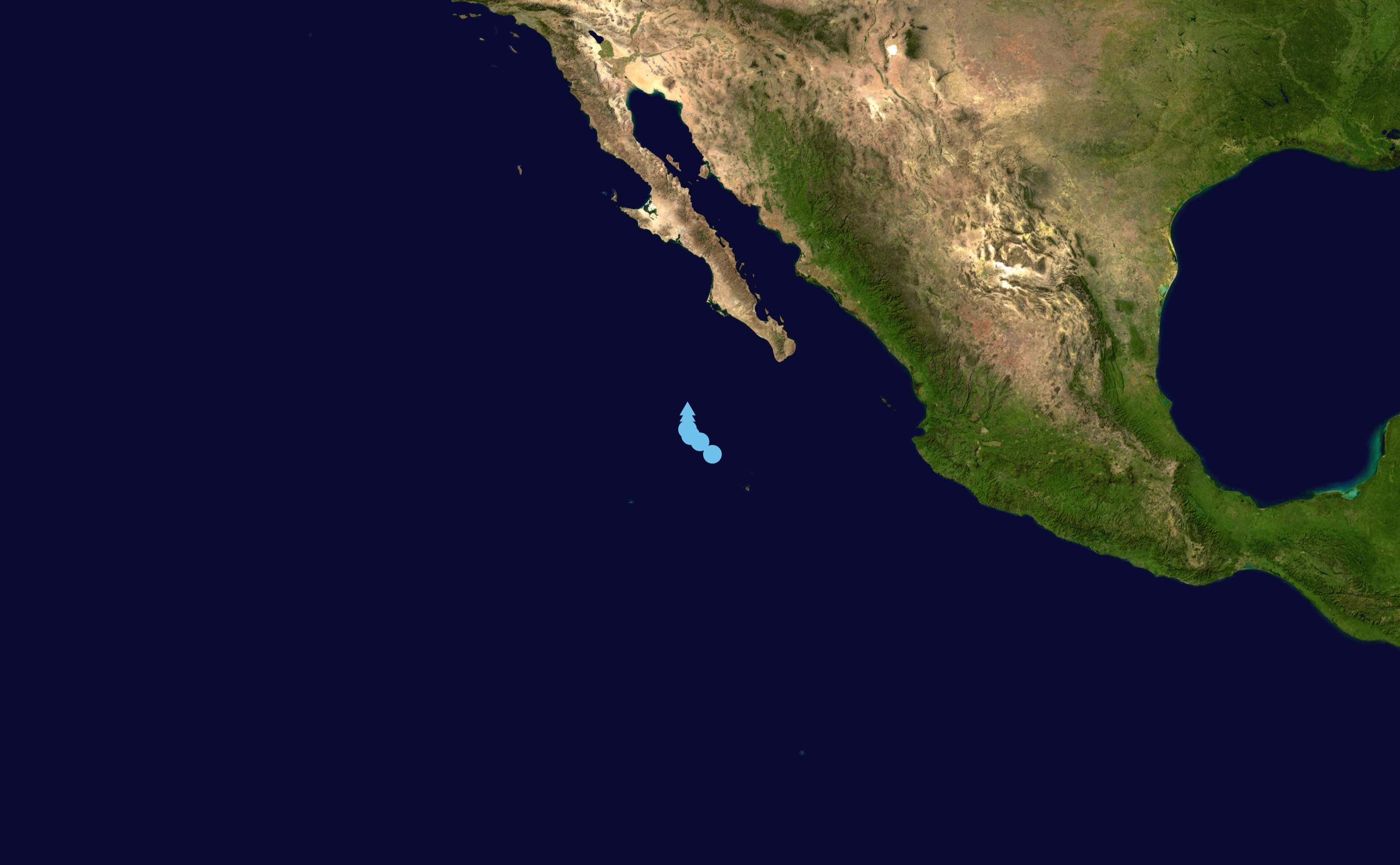
- Duration: June 29 – June 30
- Peak intensity: 30 mph (45 km/h) (1-min); 1006 mbar (hPa)

A broad area of disturbed weather, at least partially enhanced by a tropical wave, formed near the Gulf of Tehuantepec on June 25. The system paralleled the Mexican coastline and only slowly organized over the coming days, eventually meeting the criteria to be designated a tropical depression around 18:00 UTC on June 29. Despite coalescing deeper convection near the center at the time of formation, Tropical Depression Four-E failed to attain winds greater than 30 mph (48 km/h) as it encountered hostile southwesterly wind shear and colder ocean waters. Instead, the system degenerated to a remnant area of low pressure by 18:00 UTC on June 30. The low turned north and dissipated well south of Baja California on July 1.

=== Tropical Storm Cristina ===
- Tropical storm (SSHWS)
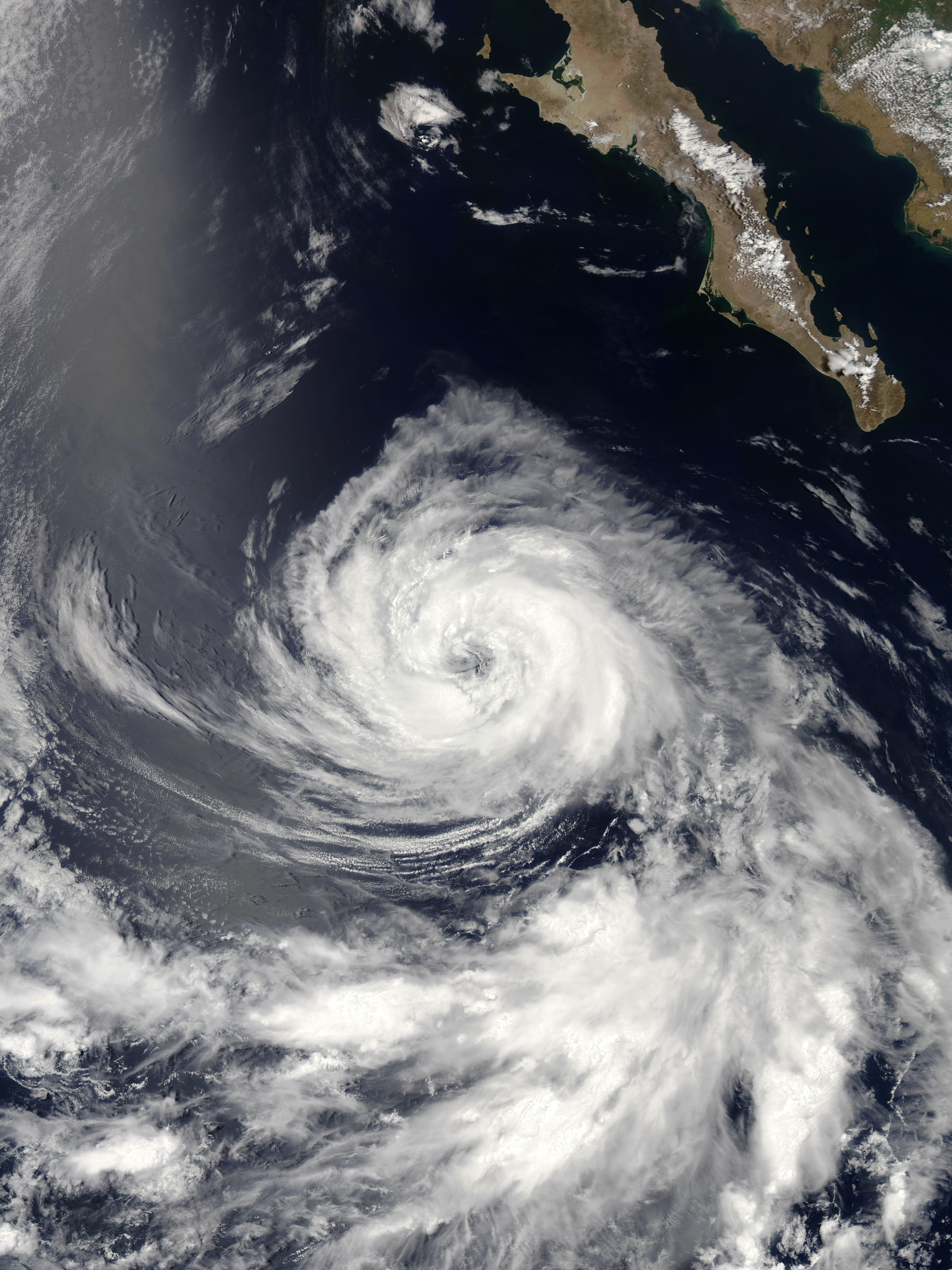
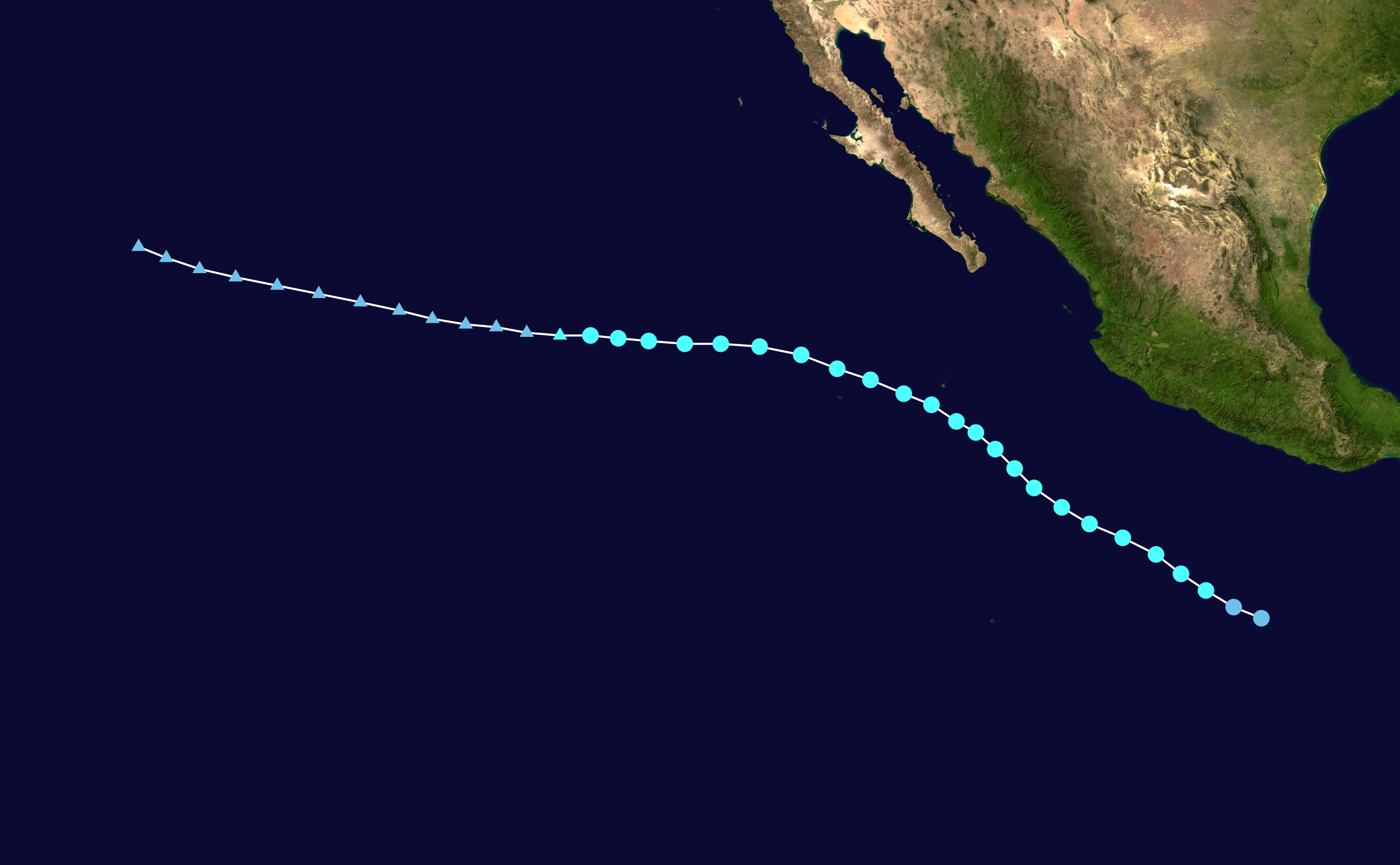
- Duration: July 6 – July 12
- Peak intensity: 70 mph (110 km/h) (1-min); 993 mbar (hPa)

A tropical wave emerged off the west coast of Africa on June 20 and crossed into the East Pacific on July 3, where it interacted with the monsoon trough and began to organize. This system developed a defined surface low on July 6 and was classified as a tropical depression about 435 mi (700 km) south of Acapulco, Guerrero. Steered along a northwest trajectory by a mid-level ridge, the depression traversed a region of favorable conditions which enabled slow intensification. Initial predictions from the NHC suggested significant strengthening of the cyclone. However, Cristina instead encountered cooler waters and eventually drier air; it reached its peak intensity late on July 10 with winds of 70 mph (110 km/h) as it passed west of Socorro Island. Thereafter, the cyclone turned west along the south side of the subtropical ridge and steady weakened. The storm degraded into a remnant low around 18:00 UTC on July 12 and degenerated into a trough on July 15 about halfway between Hawaii and Baja California Sur.

=== Tropical Depression Six-E ===
- Tropical depression (SSHWS)
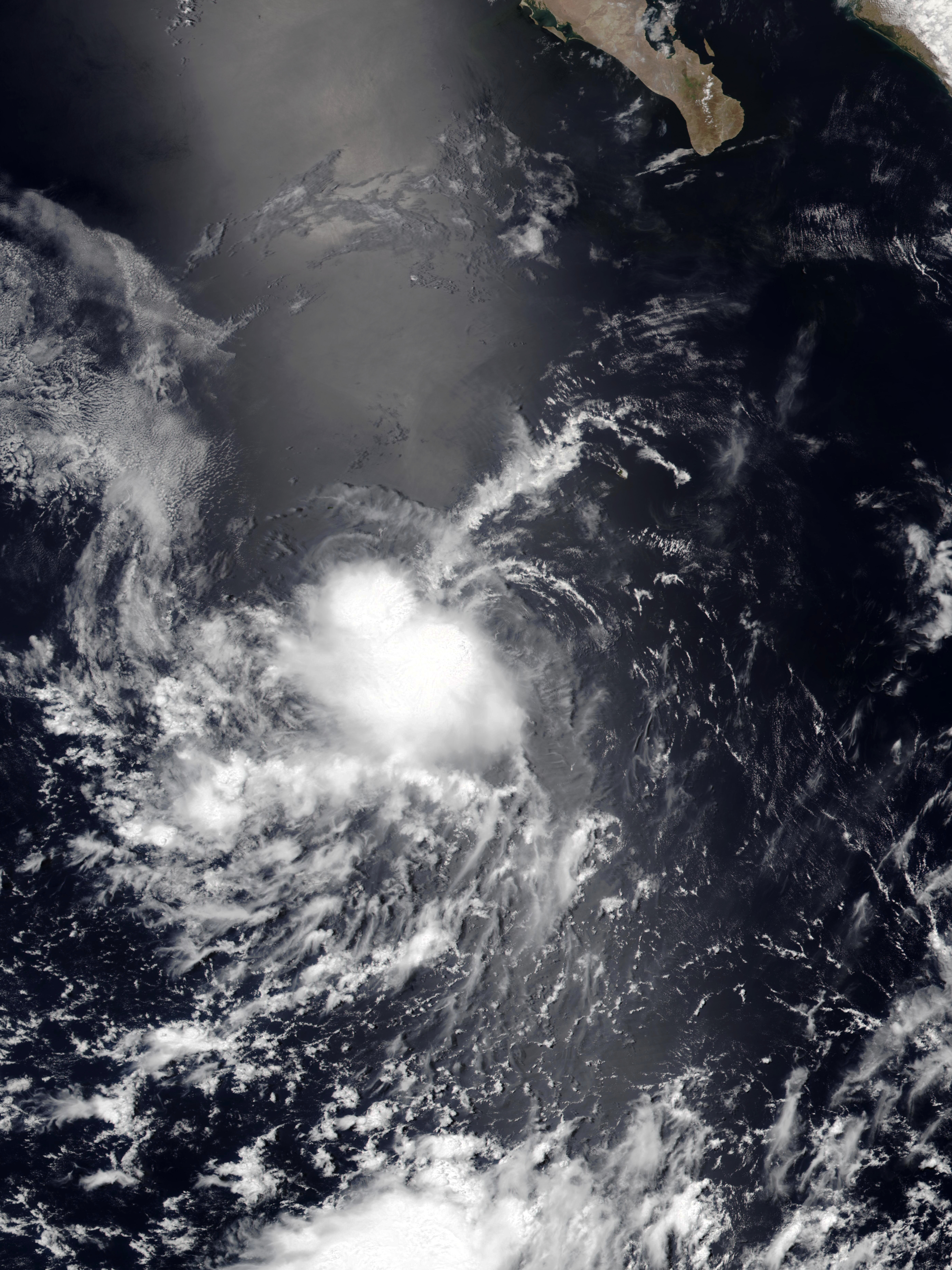
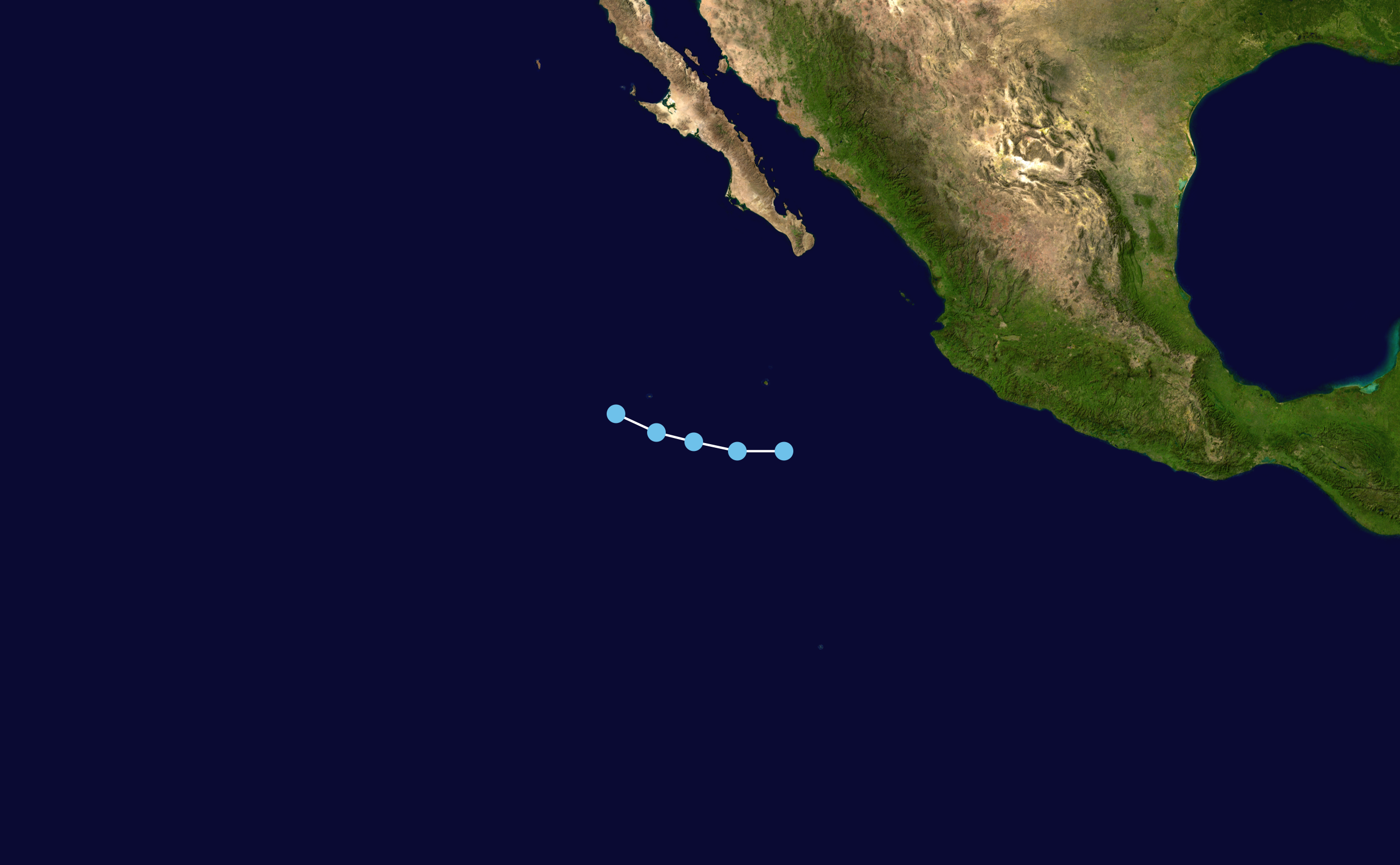
- Duration: July 13 – July 14
- Peak intensity: 35 mph (55 km/h) (1-min); 1007 mbar (hPa)

A tropical wave, emerging off Africa on July 2, fractured over the western Atlantic several days later. The southern wave axis continued into the eastern Pacific, where its interaction with the monsoon trough resulted in the formation of an area of low pressure. This low failed to organize for a few days as it was hindered by strong northeasterly wind shear, and indeed it briefly opened up into a trough. On July 13, a burst of extremely deep convection led to the redevelopment of a new circulation, and the system organized into a tropical depression around 12:00 UTC that day. As the cyclone moved west-northwest away from Mexico, its associated convection waned, preventing the system from intensifying to a tropical storm. Instead, Tropical Depression Six-E dissipated into an open trough once again around 18:00 UTC on July 14.

=== Unnamed tropical storm (Seven-E) ===
- Tropical storm (SSHWS)
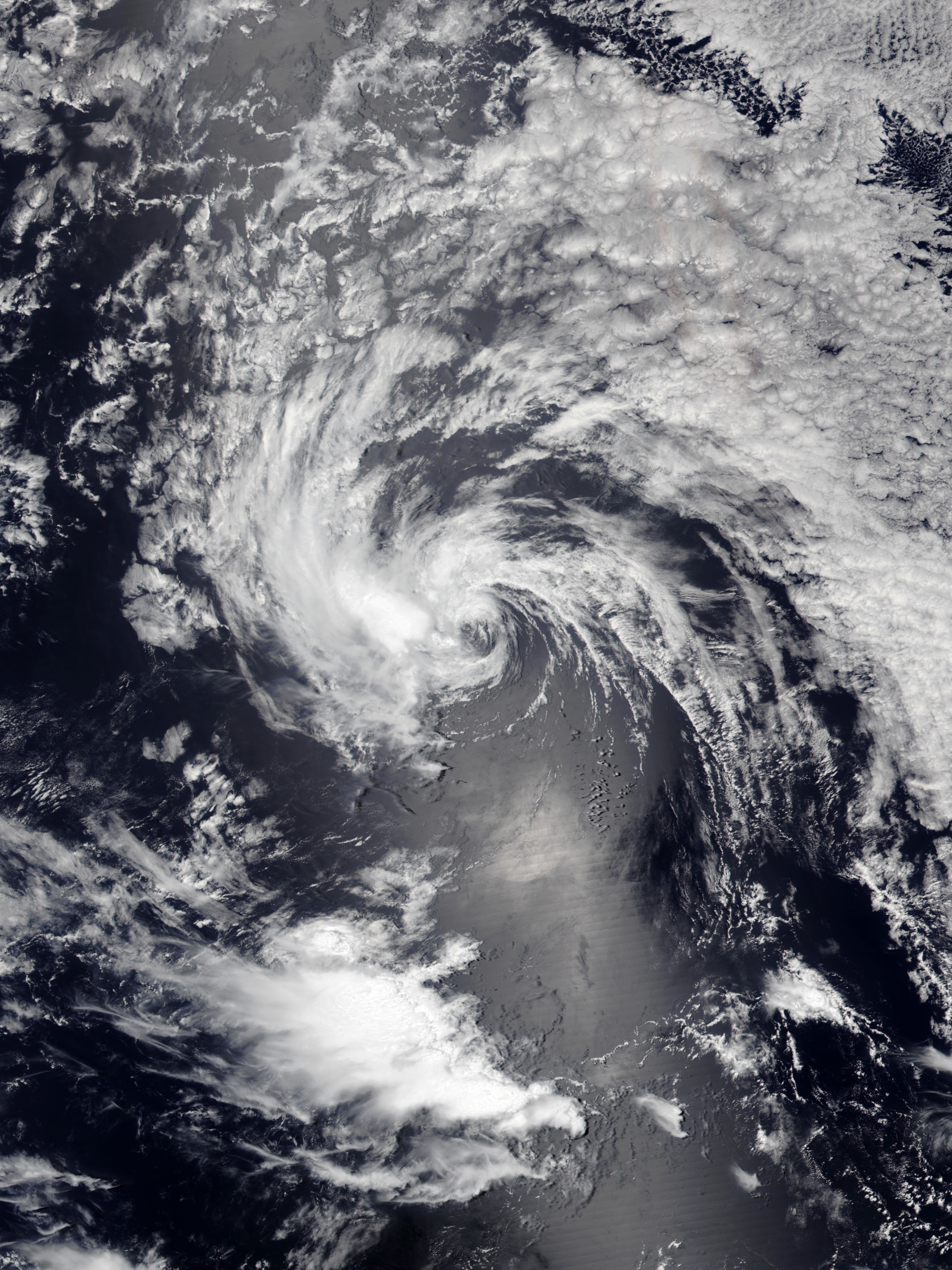
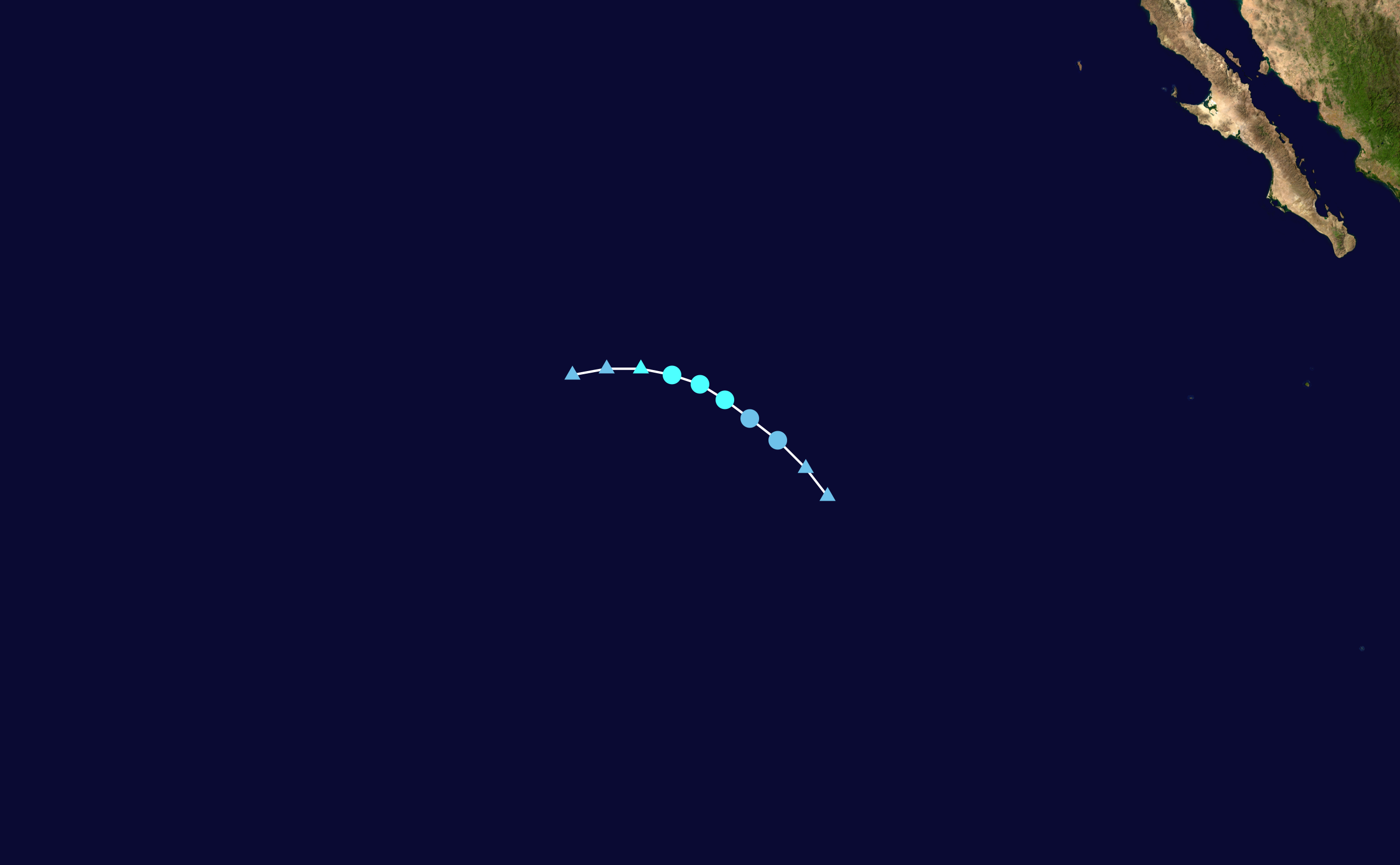
- Duration: July 20 – July 21
- Peak intensity: 40 mph (65 km/h) (1-min); 1006 mbar (hPa)

A tropical wave left Africa on July 6 and emerged into the East Pacific on July 13. It moved west and steadily coalesced despite an environment of cool ocean waters and dry air. At 00:00 UTC on July 20, the disturbance organized into a tropical depression. In real time, the depression was not assessed to have intensified further. However, a post-season review of satellite wind data revealed that it briefly became a 40 mph (64 km/h) tropical storm around the time it displayed a well-defined rainband in its western quadrant. This peak in intensity was short-lived as the system became devoid of deep convection; by 06:00 UTC on July 21, The system degenerated to a remnant low. The low then spun down and dissipated by 00:00 UTC on July 22.

=== Hurricane Douglas ===
- Category 4 hurricane (SSHWS)
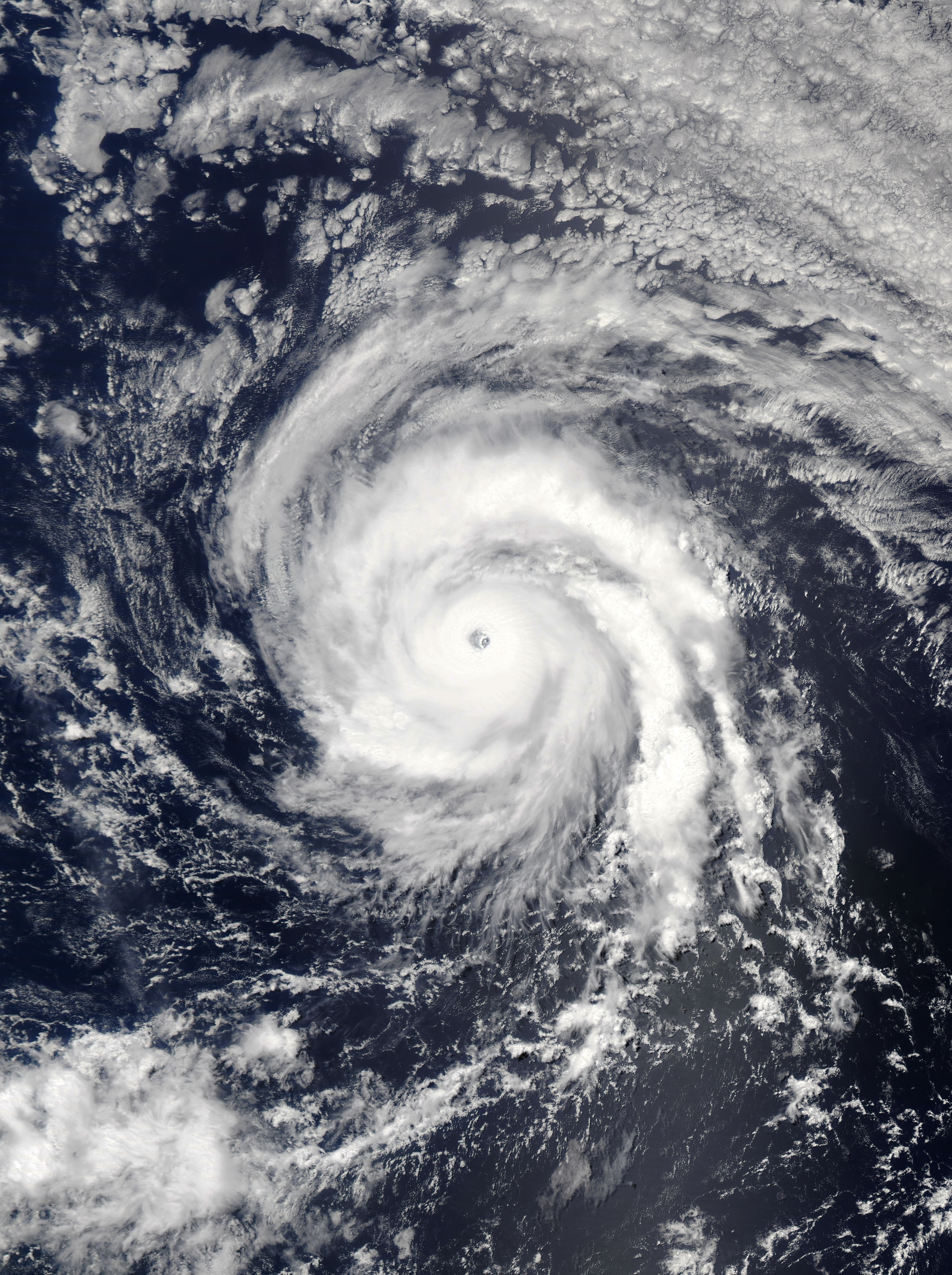
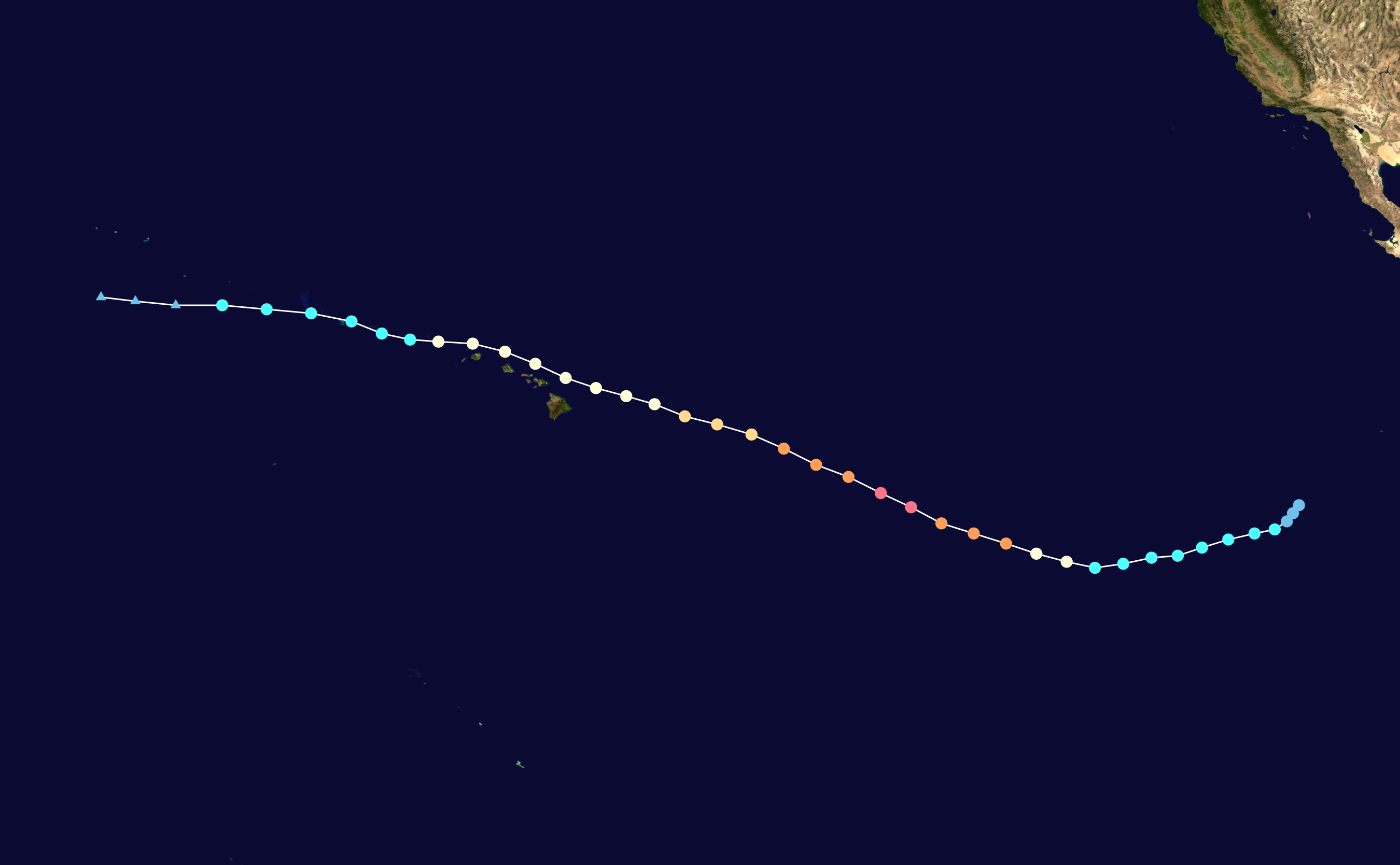
- Duration: July 20 – July 28
- Peak intensity: 130 mph (215 km/h) (1-min); 954 mbar (hPa)

A tropical wave departed Africa on July 8, reaching the eastern Pacific a week later. Continuing to the west, the wave spawned Tropical Depression Eight-E on July 20, located about 805 mi (1,296 km) southwest of Baja California Sur. Its convection evolved into a central dense overcast, signaling that it strengthened into Tropical Storm Douglas. The storm moved southwestward due to a ridge to its north. On July 22, intensification halted after the circulation entrained dry air, before the thunderstorms reformed and developed an eye. Later that day, Douglas attained hurricane status, becoming the first hurricane of the season. It soon underwent rapid deepening as a ring of intense thunderstorms formed around the eye. On July 23, Douglas became a major hurricane. On the next day, it became a Category 4 hurricane with peak winds of 130 mph (210 km/h) and a minimum central pressure of 954 millibars (28.2 inHg). Soon after, Douglas entered into the central Pacific, where its eye had become increasingly cloud-filled as it moved over cooler waters. On July 25, it dropped to a Category 1 hurricane as it approached Hawaii. On July 27, the center of Douglas passed 60 mi (97 km) north of Oahu. On the next day, it weakened into a tropical storm, as wind shear quickly displaced the convection. On July 29, Douglas degenerated into a remnant low, which opened into a trough just west of the International Date Line on July 30.

Douglas's close proximity led to hurricane warnings for much of the Hawaiian islands. On Oahu, 13 emergency shelters were opened across the island for those in need. On July 25, the Hawai'i Volcanoes National Park closed due to the hurricane. Despite Douglas's close pass to the Hawaiian Islands, much of the islands were spared from the worst of the hurricane as only the weak southern eyewall of Douglas brushed the islands. Overall damage was relatively minor; however, storm surge and rainfall caused moderate flooding in Kauai and Oahu. Winds never exceeded hurricane-force, although a 69 mph (111 km/h) wind gust occurred on Maui. Strong winds caused a small tree to fall on the Hana Highway. Rainfall totals also reached up to 6 inches in Maui and Oahu.

=== Hurricane Elida ===
- Category 2 hurricane (SSHWS)
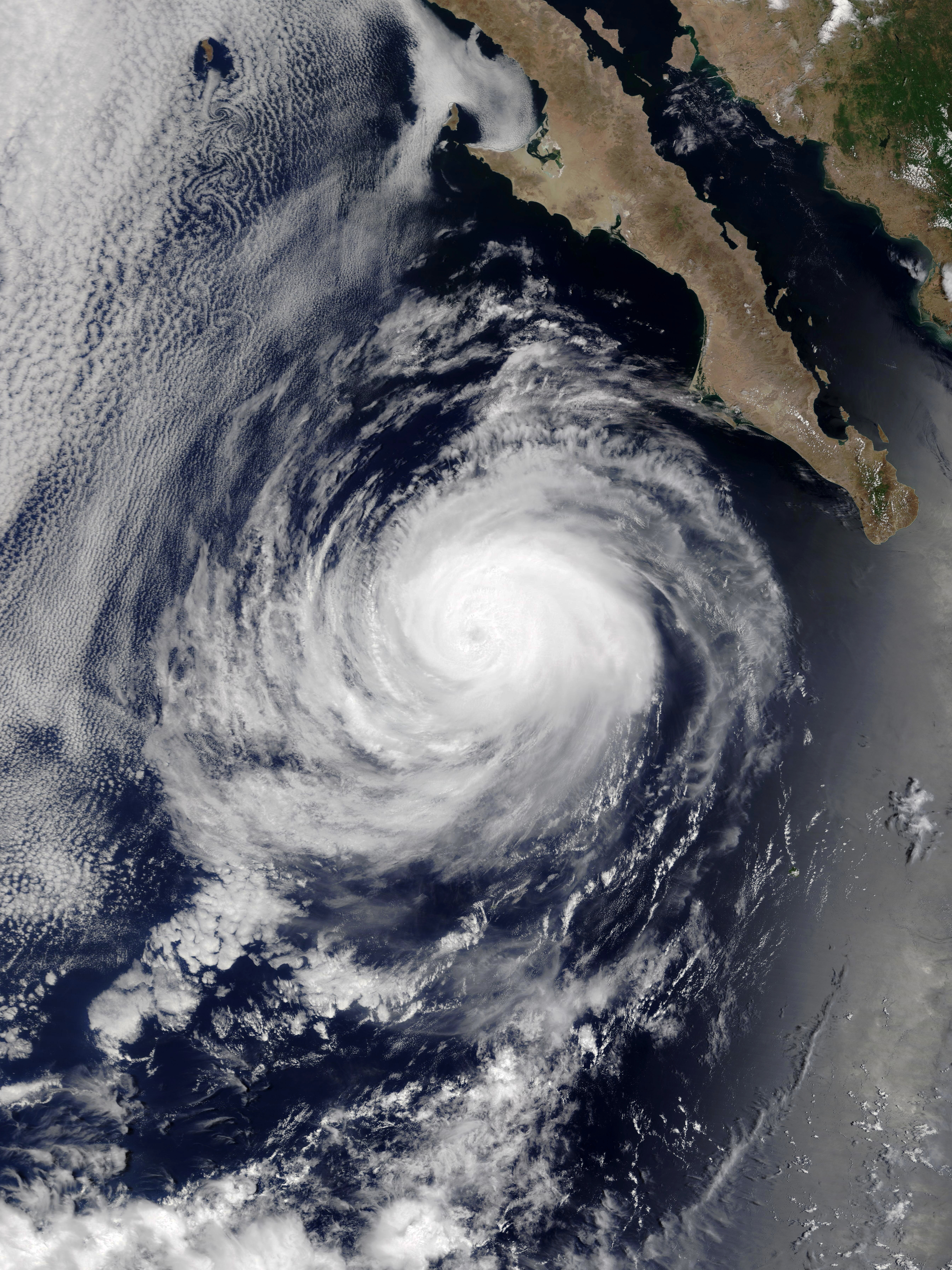
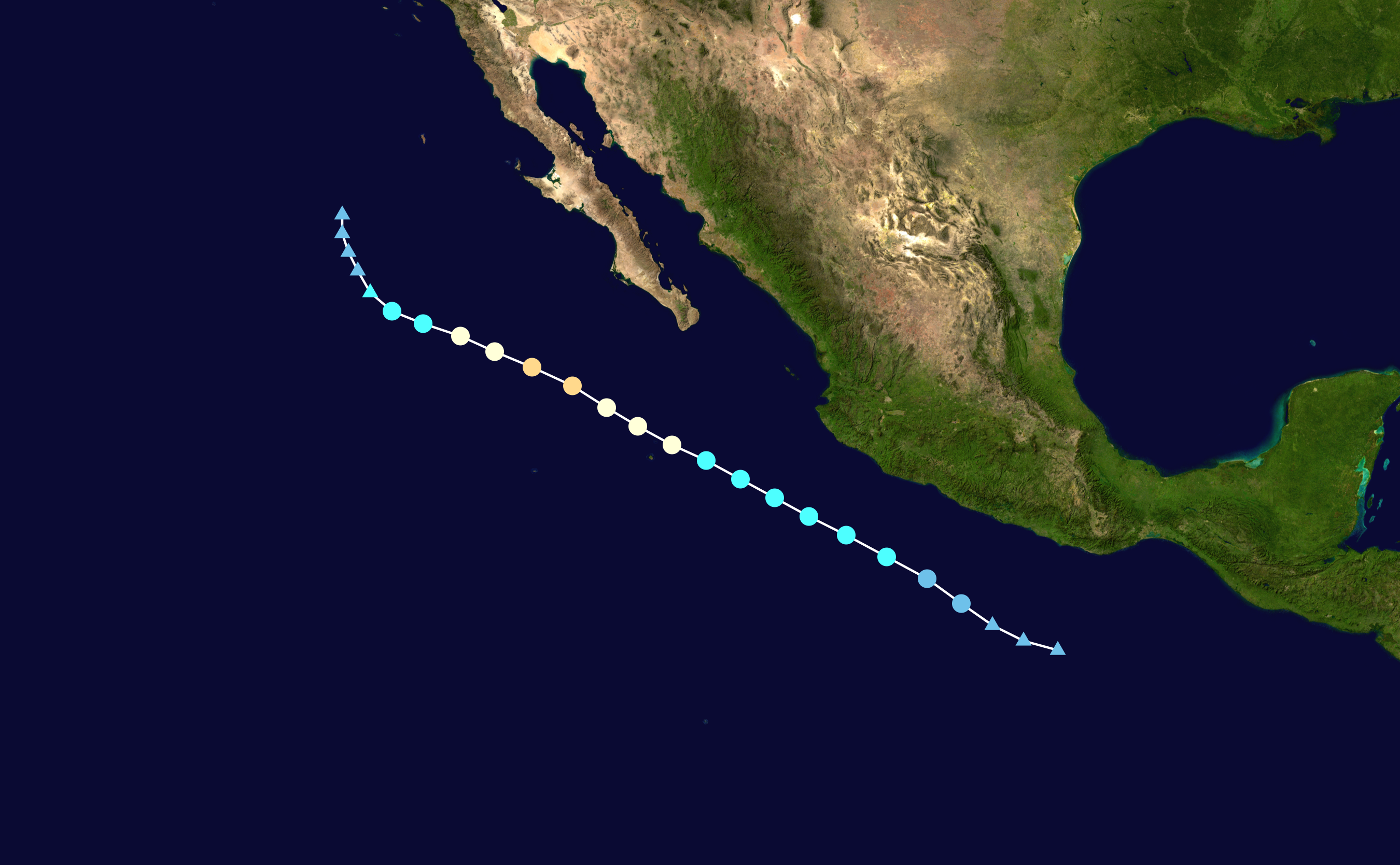
- Duration: August 8 – August 12
- Peak intensity: 105 mph (165 km/h) (1-min); 971 mbar (hPa)

A tropical wave emerged off Africa on July 26 and split over the Caribbean several days later, with the southern portion of the wave continuing into the eastern Pacific. A small low developed in association with this wave, eventually organizing into a tropical depression by 18:00 UTC on August 8. Twelve hours later, the depression intensified into Tropical Storm Elida while paralleling the coastline of Mexico. Owing to favorable environmental conditions, Elida intensified steadily on August 9 and then rapidly the following day, attaining hurricane strength around 18:00 UTC on August 10. An eye developed within the storm's compact and symmetrical central dense overcast, and Elida reached peak winds of 105 mph (169 km/h) by 12:00 UTC the next morning. Ultimately, the influence of dry air and cooler waters caused the storm to swiftly weaken, and it degenerated to a remnant area of low pressure by 00:00 UTC on August 13 while positioned west of Baja California Sur. The low turned north before opening up into a trough a little over 24 hours later.

=== Tropical Depression Ten-E ===
- Tropical depression (SSHWS)
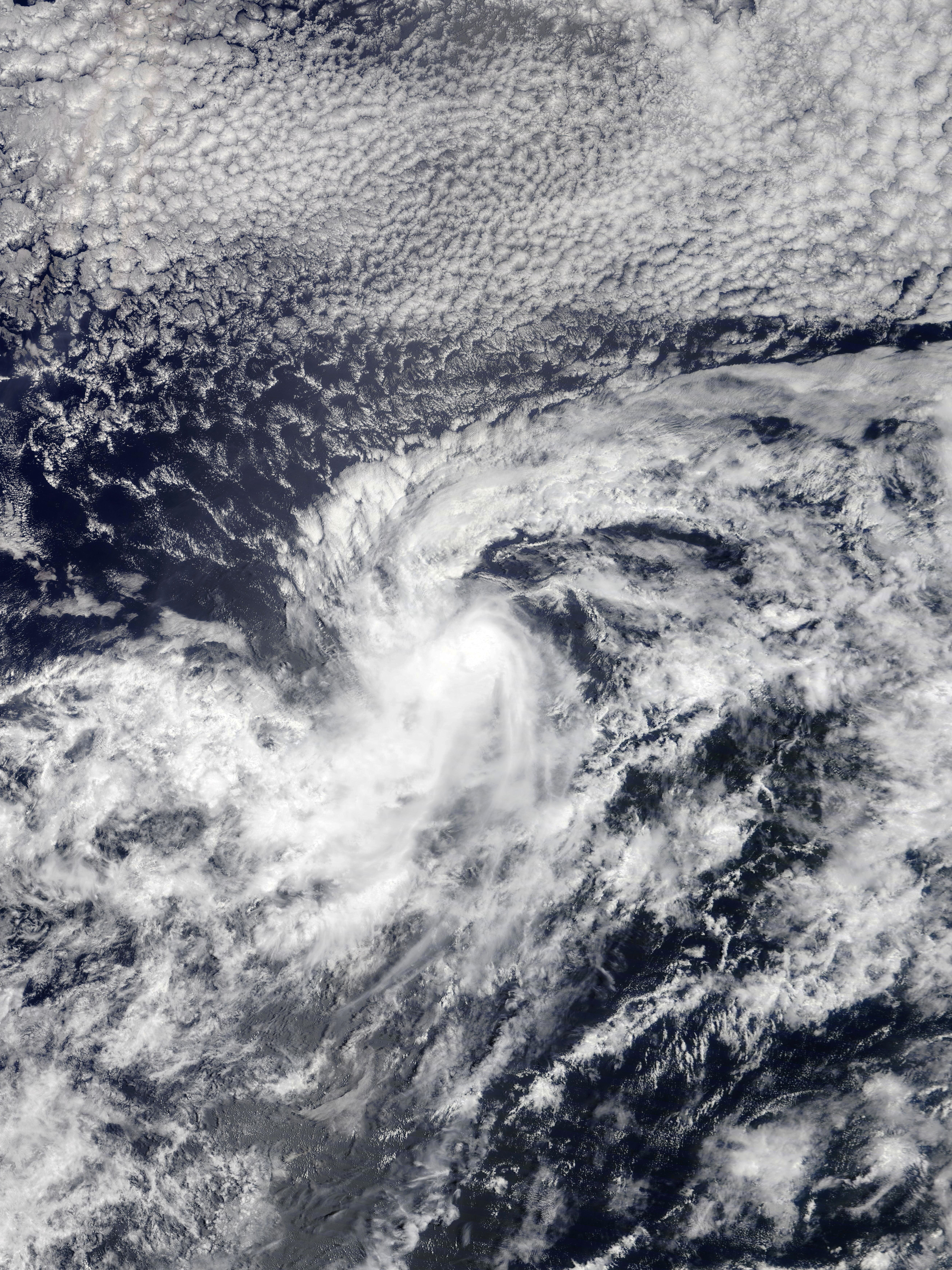
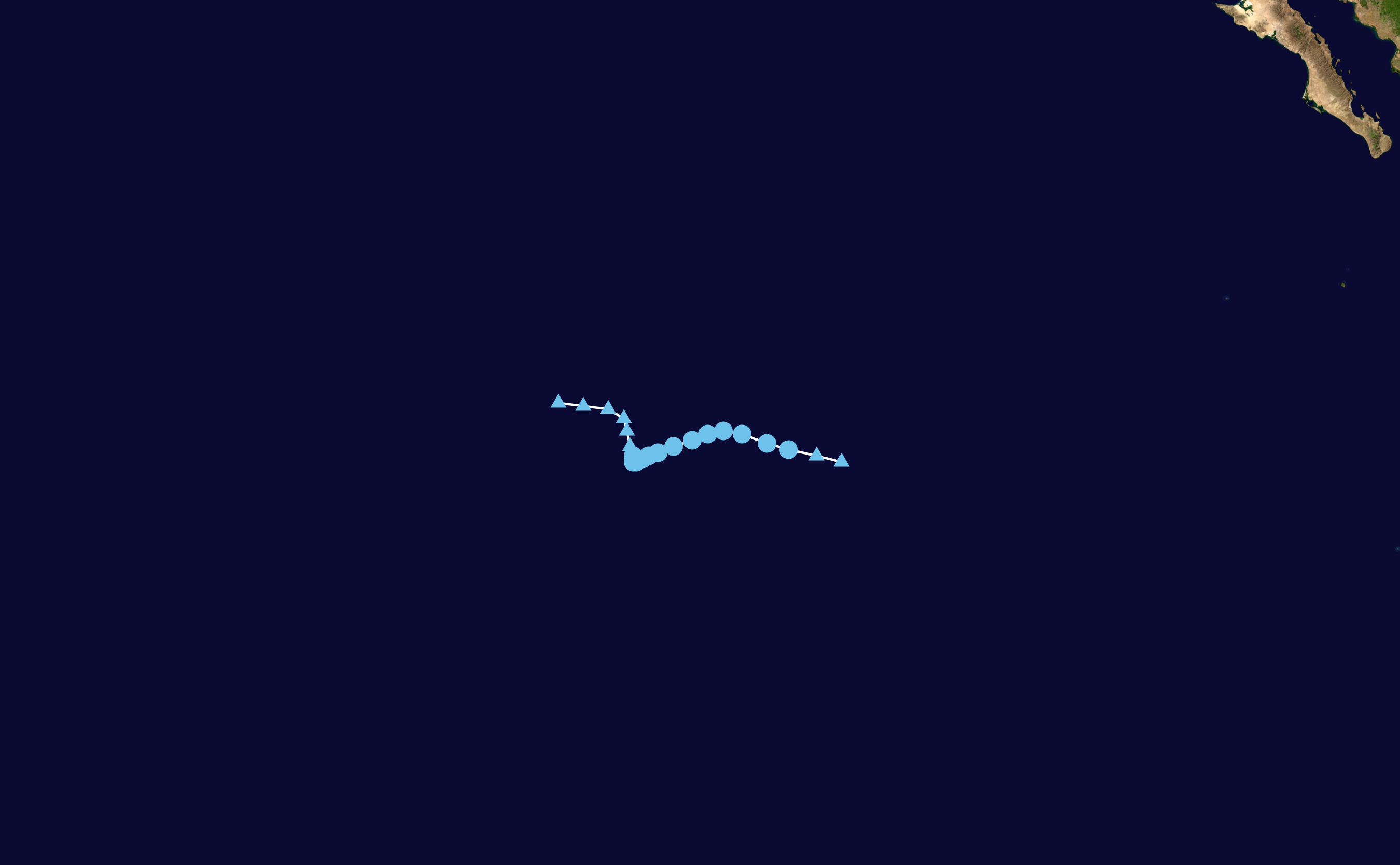
- Duration: August 13 – August 16
- Peak intensity: 35 mph (55 km/h) (1-min); 1004 mbar (hPa)

An area of disturbed weather formed within the monsoon trough southwest of Baja California on August 11. It moved west and gradually organized, becoming a tropical depression at 06:00 UTC on August 13 while located over the open East Pacific. The system tracked over warm ocean waters, but it was persistently hindered by strong northeasterly wind shear. Thus, it maintained peak winds of 35 mph (56 km/h) and failed to ever become a tropical storm. The depression moved erratically as ridging to its north weakened. After a few days of producing intermittent convection, the system degenerated to a remnant low around 12:00 UTC on August 16. It opened up into a trough the next day.

=== Tropical Storm Fausto ===
- Tropical storm (SSHWS)
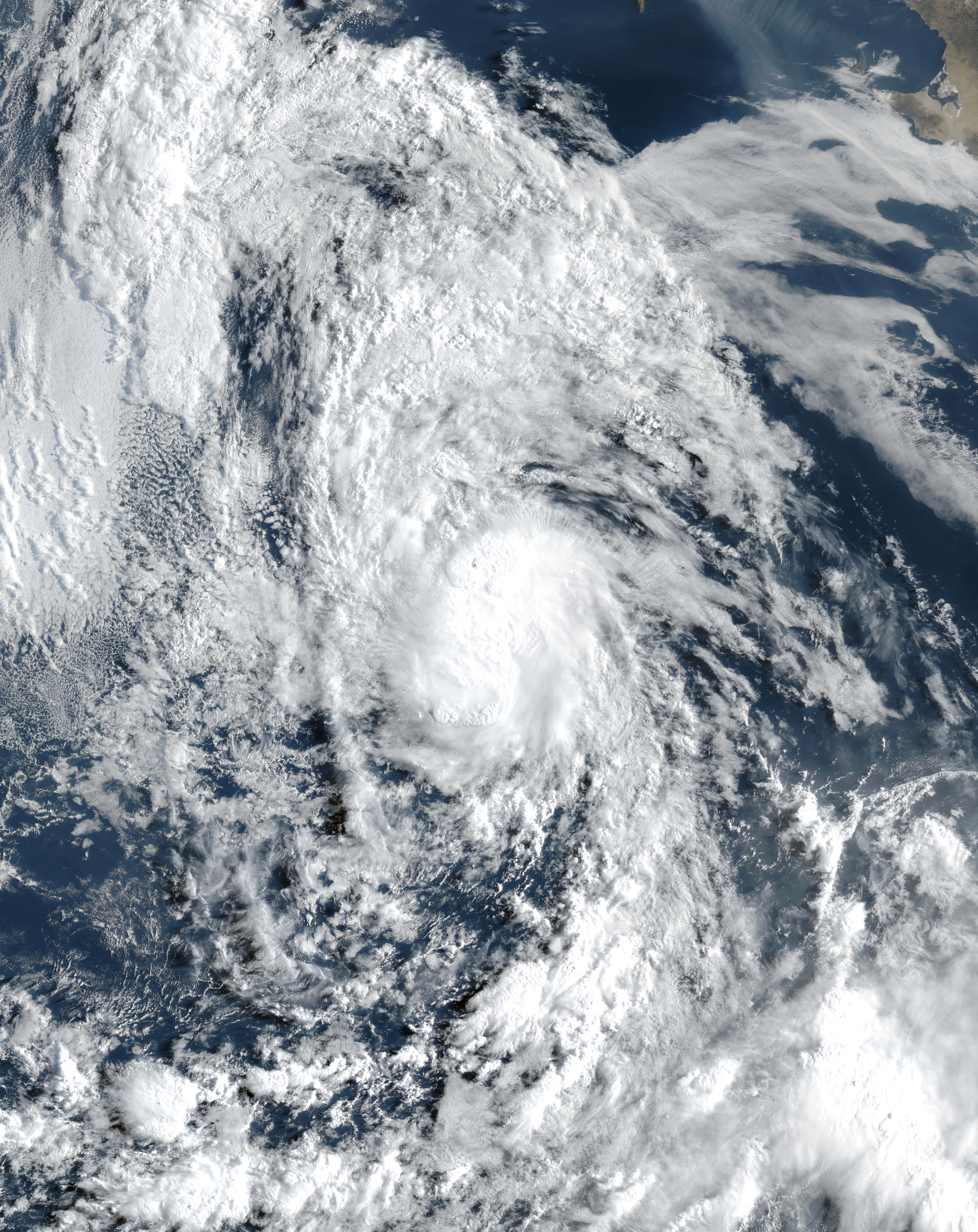
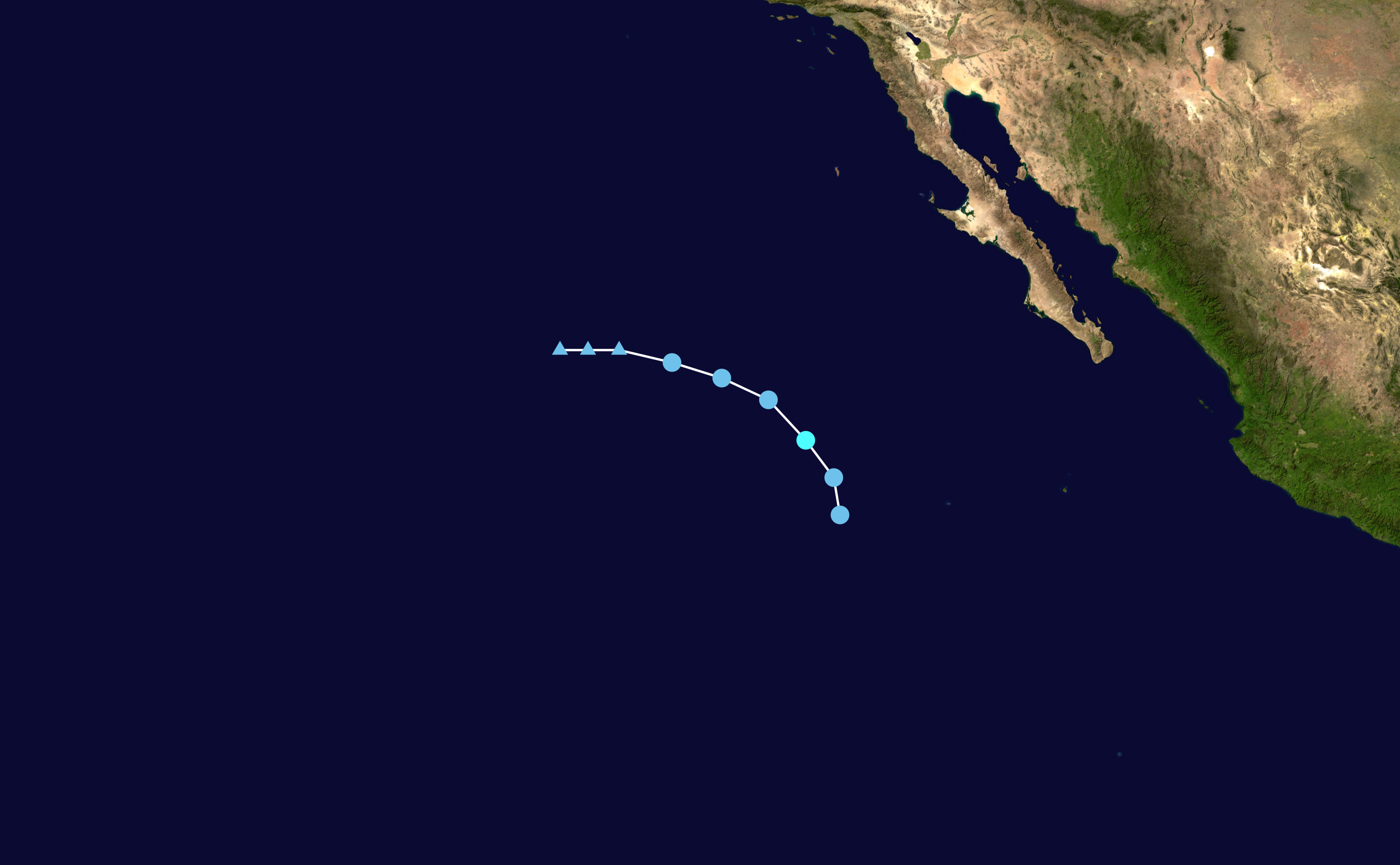
- Duration: August 16 – August 17
- Peak intensity: 40 mph (65 km/h) (1-min); 1004 mbar (hPa)

A tropical wave entered the East Pacific on August 9 and spawned the development of a tropical depression around 00:00 UTC on August 16, despite ongoing easterly wind shear. The depression intensified into Tropical Storm Fausto six hours later, but it was immediately stripped of its convection and thus fell back to a tropical depression only six hours after earning a name. Fausto curved toward the west and moved over colder waters, which further enabled its weakening. The system degenerated to a remnant low around 12:00 UTC on August 17, far away from land. The low moved west and opened up into a trough about a day later.

A large plume of moisture brought northwards by Fausto generated massive thunderstorms across a large portion of Northern California, beginning on August 16. These storms produced mostly dry lightning with little to no rain, with almost 11,000 lightning strikes occurring in the state between August 16 and 17. The lightning from these storms sparked 367 fires across the state, several of which became very large in a short period of time, threatening thousands of structures and forcing thousands of people to evacuate. The massive SCU Lightning Complex, August Complex, CZU Lightning Complex, and North Complex fires were connected to the thunderstorms associated with Fausto.

=== Hurricane Genevieve ===
- Category 4 hurricane (SSHWS)
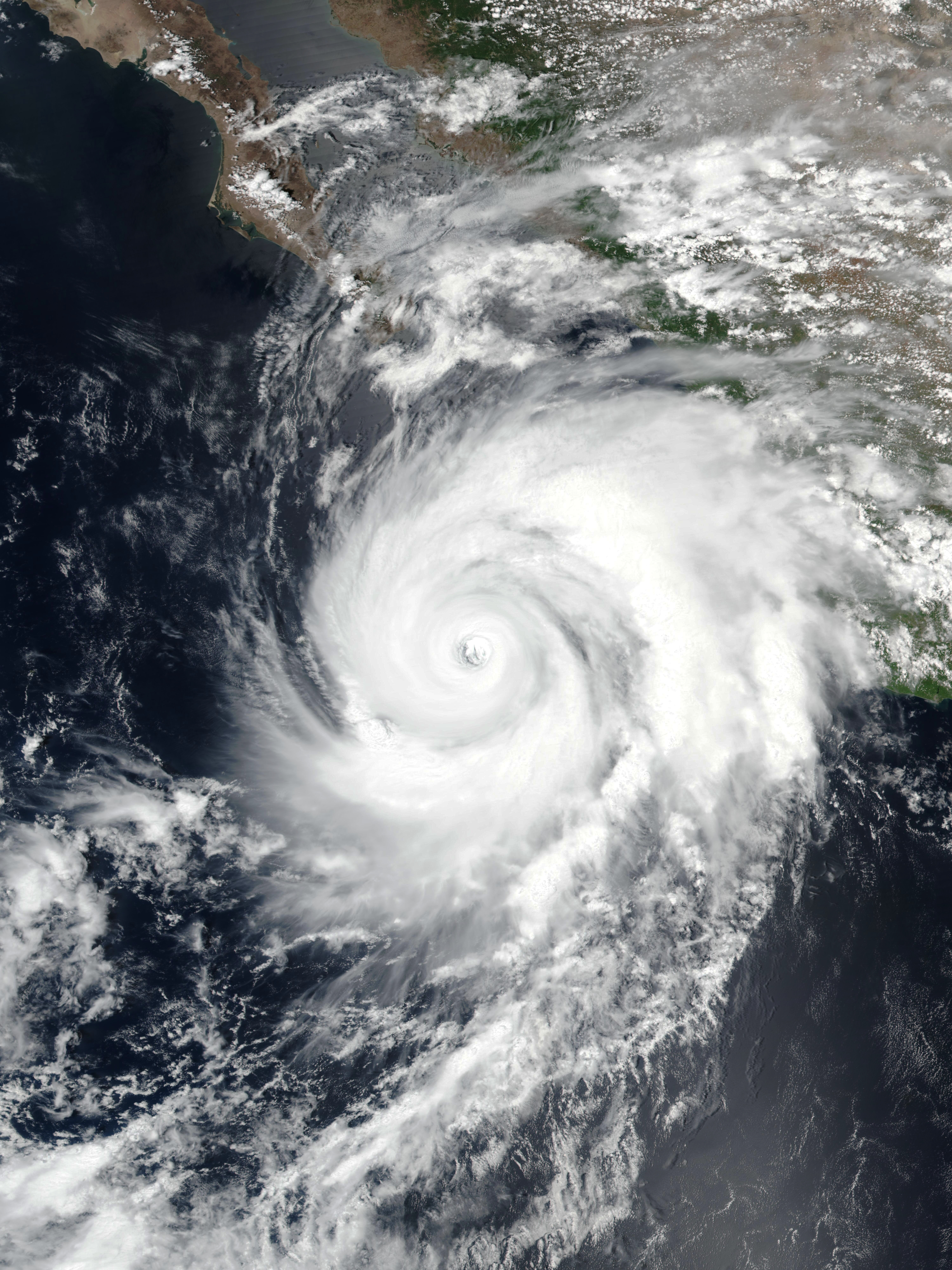
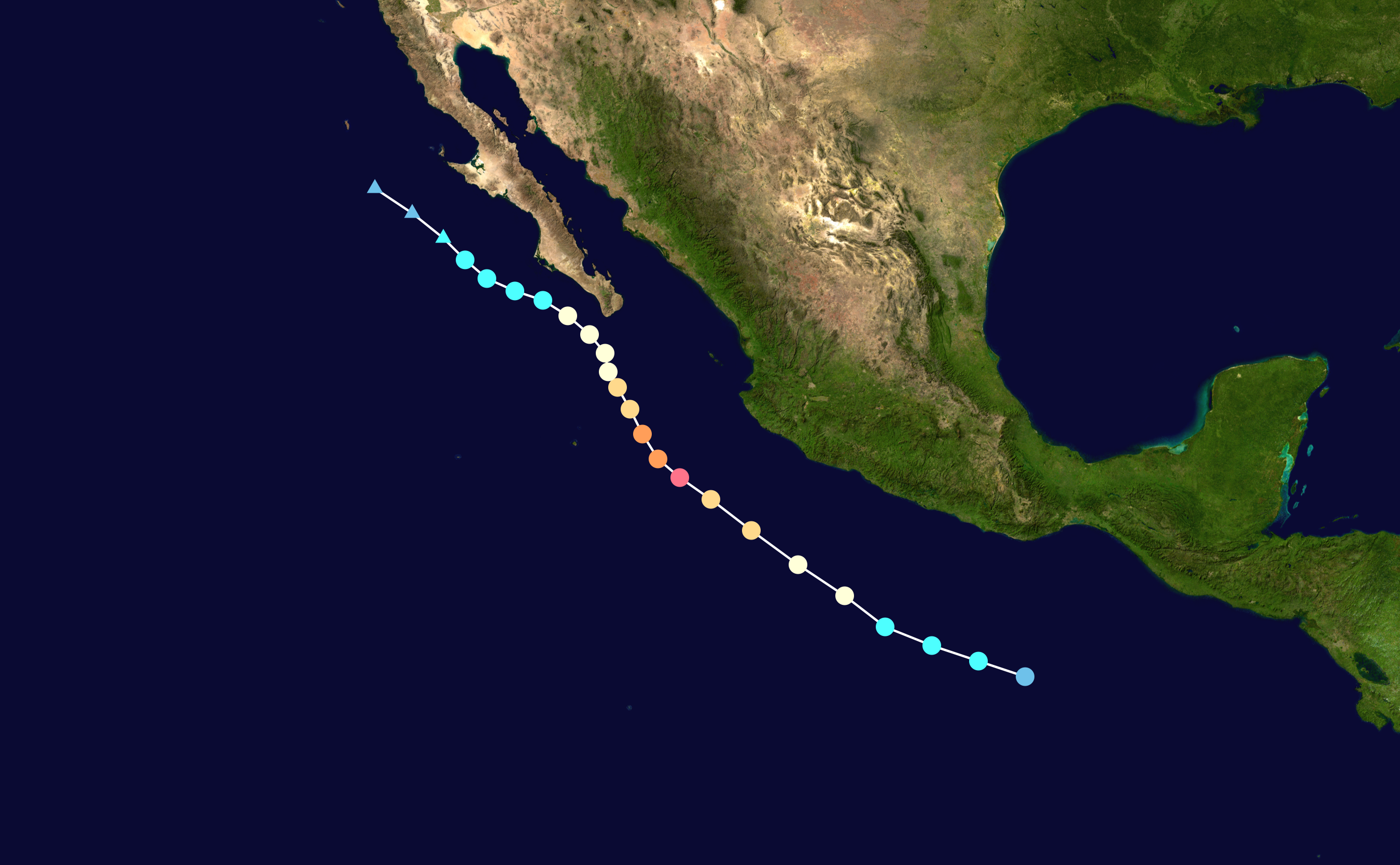
- Duration: August 16 – August 21
- Peak intensity: 130 mph (215 km/h) (1-min); 950 mbar (hPa)

A tropical wave crossed Central America on August 13, becoming the season's next tropical depression around 12:00 UTC on August 16 while located about 300 mi (485 km) south of Puerto Ángel, Oaxaca. Favorable environmental conditions supported its rapid development while it moved northwest parallel to Mexico. It intensified into Tropical Storm Genevieve at 18:00 UTC on August 16 and became a hurricane around 12:00 UTC the next morning. Within the ensuing 24-hour period, Genevieve's maximum winds increased from 75 to 130 mph (121 to 209 km/h), equivalent to a Category 4 hurricane, as it harbored a well-defined eye on satellite imagery. A weakening trend began almost immediately as the storm faced higher southwesterly wind shear and a track over colder waters left by Tropical Storm Elida. The system curved north for a time, nearly moving onshore Baja California Sur before it bent back northwest. This track over colder waters caused Genevieve to lose convection and degenerate to a remnant low around 18:00 UTC on August 21. It dissipated a little under a day later.

Genevieve's close pass to Baja California Sur brought its strong winds onshore, with a peak sustained wind of 70 mph (110 km/h) and gust of 90 mph (140 km/h) observed at Cabo San Lucas Marina. Isolated rainfall totals around 4 in (100 mm) overspread Oaxaca and Guerrero, and a storm-peak accumulation of 11.2 in (280 mm) occurred at Cabo San Lucas. Resultant flooding caused some damage to hydraulic, highway, and electrical systems throughout Baja California Sur; total damage topped $50 million. Six people were killed: two via landslides and two via swollen rivers in Oaxaca, plus two from drownings at the resort of Los Cabos in Baja California Sur.

=== Tropical Storm Hernan ===
- Tropical storm (SSHWS)
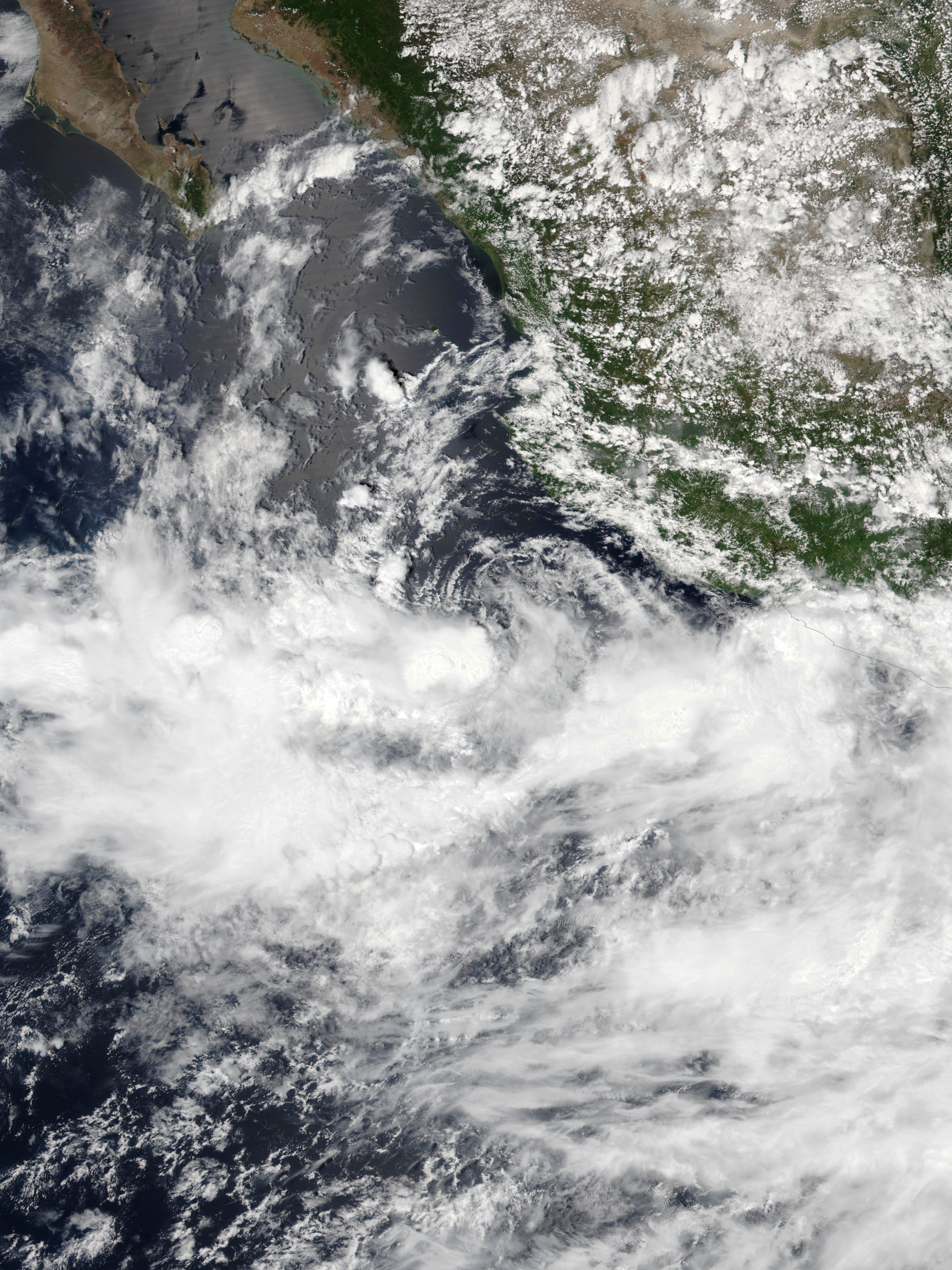
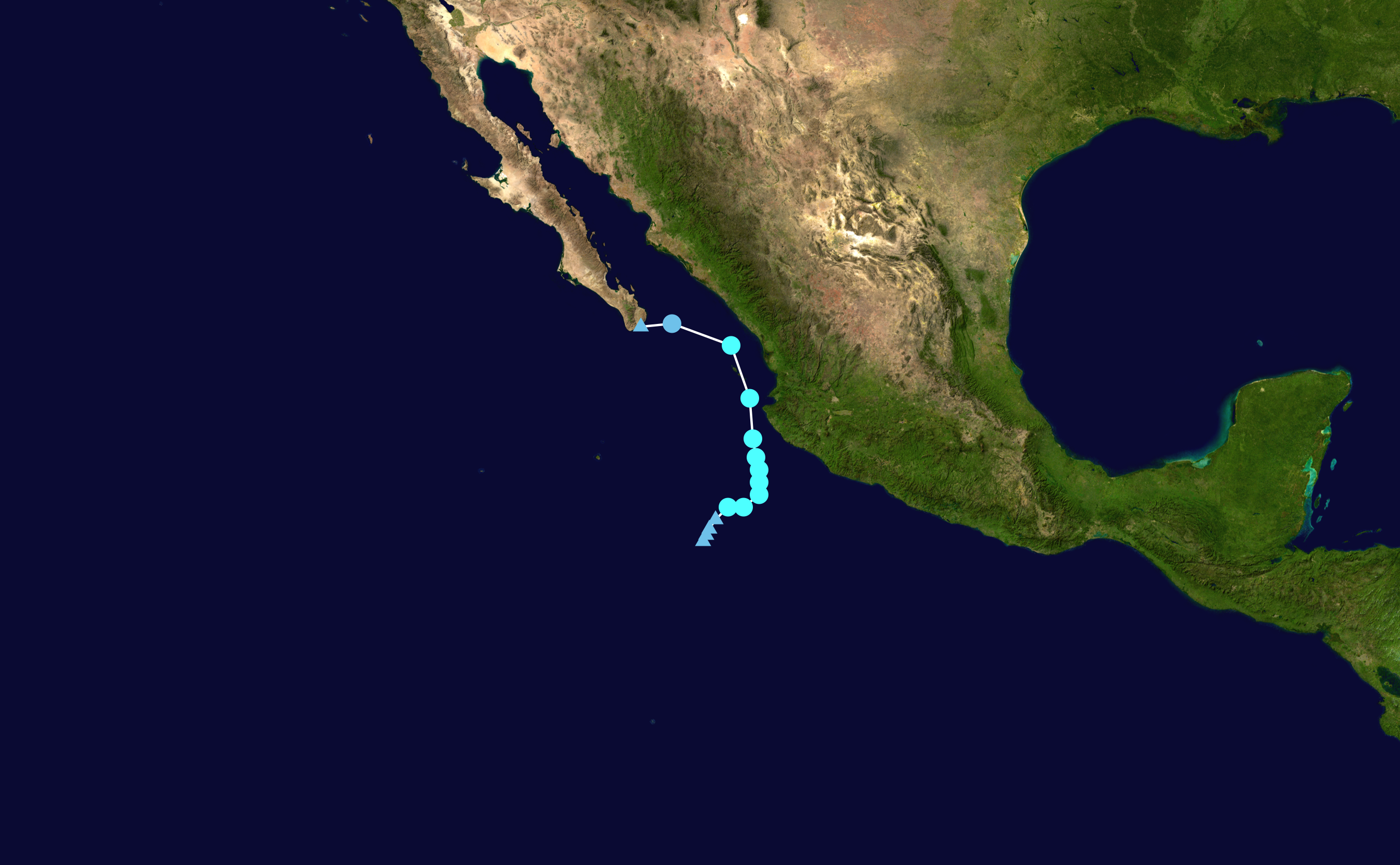
- Duration: August 26 – August 28
- Peak intensity: 45 mph (75 km/h) (1-min); 1001 mbar (hPa)

The favorable phase of the MJO moved across the East Pacific, enhancing the monsoon trough and spawning an area of disturbed weather. Three areas of low pressure formed along this trough, with the first one developing into Tropical Storm Hernan around 06:00 UTC on August 26. Broad in nature and under the influence of easterly wind shear, Hernan attained peak winds of 45 mph (72 km/h) on August 27 but began to rapidly weaken the next day as it moved north just offshore the Mexico coastline. It degenerated to a remnant low at 18:00 UTC on August 28. The low curved west around a broad circulation that contained the developing Tropical Storm Iselle before being absorbed by that feature later in the day.

In Mexico, 97,000 customers lost electricity. Hernan dropped heavy rainfall across southwestern Mexico, peaking at 23.24 in (590 mm) in Jalisco. causing flash flooding and mudslides in several states. At least 400 people were evacuated in Jalisco, and 18 people stuck on their roof in the state had to be rescued. In Cihuatlán, roughly 365 residents evacuated into shelters. A sinkhole shut down a portion of Mexican Federal Highway 80 between Santa Cruz and San Patricio, a mudslide closed down another part of the freeway near Lázaro Cárdenas. The Cuixmala River overflowed its banks, causing parts of Mexican Federal Highway 200 to shut down. The town of La Manzanilla was mostly inundated by floodwaters which caused a bridge near the town to collapse. Several schools were damaged by Hernan in the state of Colima. In Tamala, a parota tree fell on a road, blocking traffic. In Manzanillo, some homes and streets were damaged and covered with mud. In Nayarit, a mudslide occurred on a hill behind a populated neighborhood in Xalisco, however, no damage has been reported from this incident. Despite Hernan weakening into a tropical depression before landfall in Baja California Sur, local weather services in the area advised residents to take extreme precautions. Total damage from Hernan in Mexico was estimated at 1.1 billion pesos (US$51.4 million).

=== Tropical Storm Iselle ===
- Tropical storm (SSHWS)
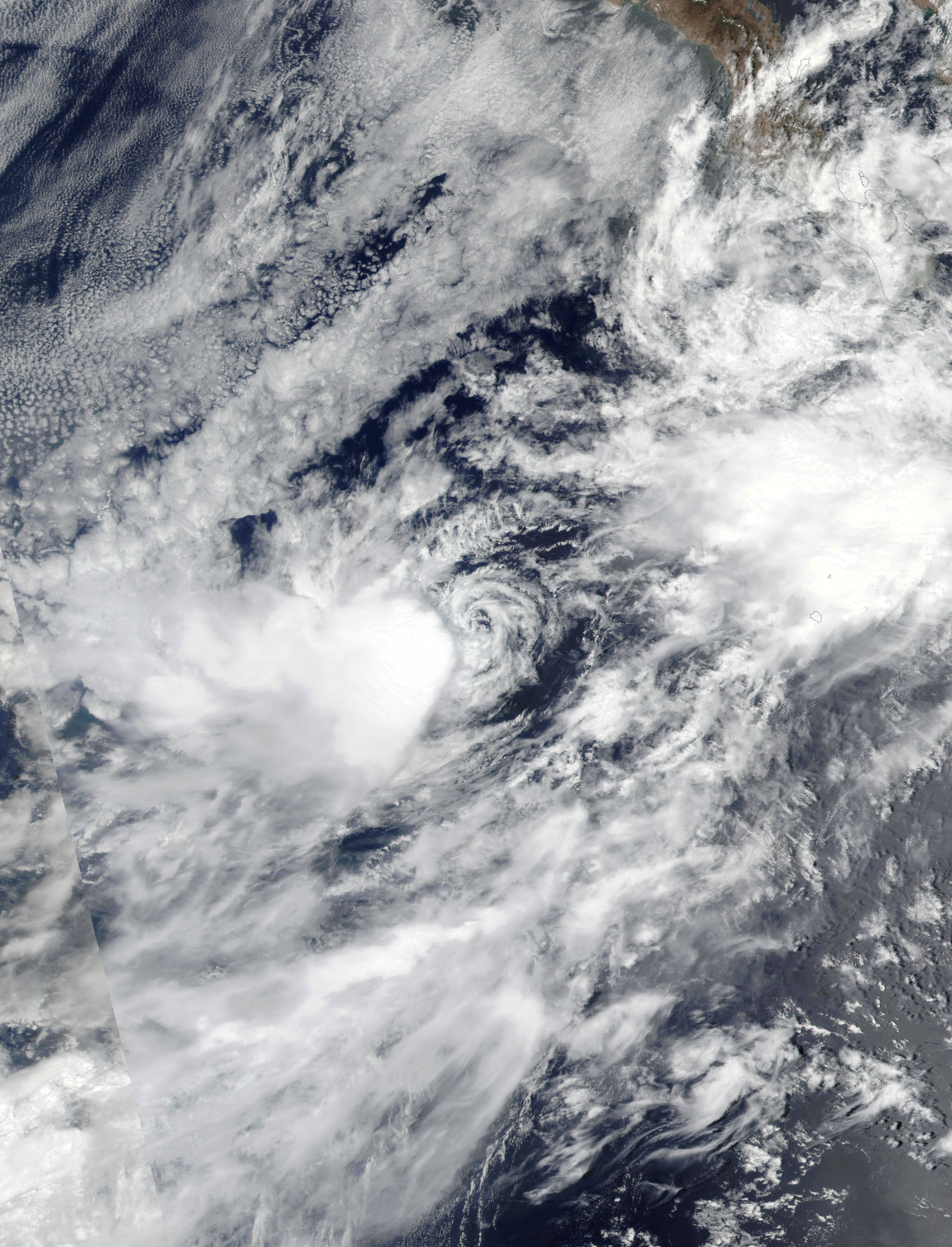
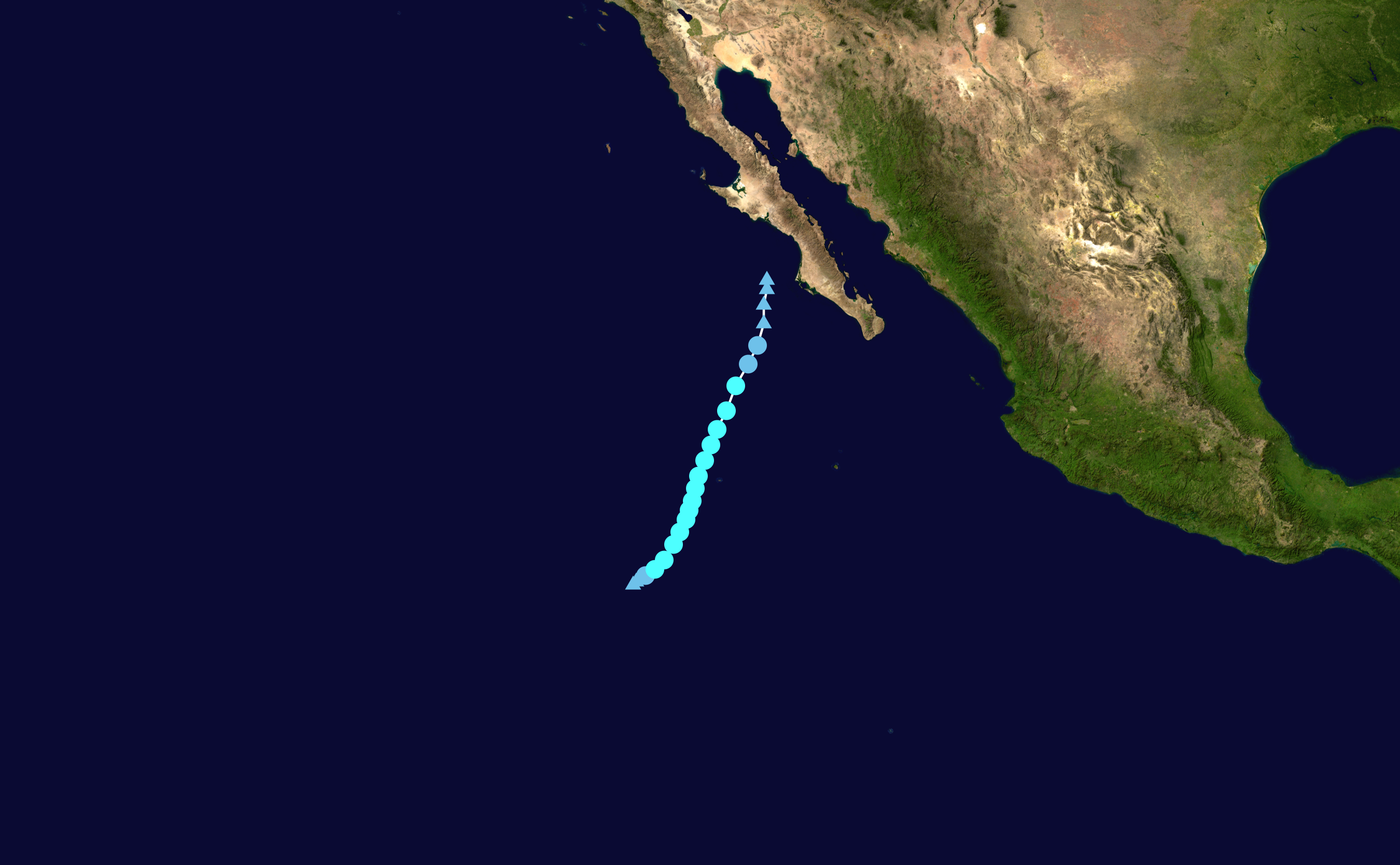
- Duration: August 26 – August 30
- Peak intensity: 60 mph (95 km/h) (1-min); 997 mbar (hPa)

Within the broad cyclonic circulation across Central America and adjacent waters, a westward-moving tropical wave spawned an area of low pressure on August 23. This low, originally weak and ill-defined, was enhanced by a CCKW two days later. Following increased organization, it became a tropical depression around 12:00 UTC on August 26 while positioned well southwest of Baja California Sur. The depression strengthened into Tropical Storm Iselle six hours later. The newly formed system encountered strong east-northeasterly wind shear, but the effects of this shear were offset by strong diffluence that aided in deep convection. Iselle reached peak winds of 60 mph (97 km/h) early on August 28 when it displayed semblance of a mid-level eye on microwave imagery. As the cyclone moved north-northeast, though, it encountered a more hostile environment and began to weaken. The system degenerated to a remnant low at 18:00 UTC on August 30, and that low dissipated 24 hours later just offshore Baja California Sur.

=== Tropical Storm Julio ===
- Tropical storm (SSHWS)
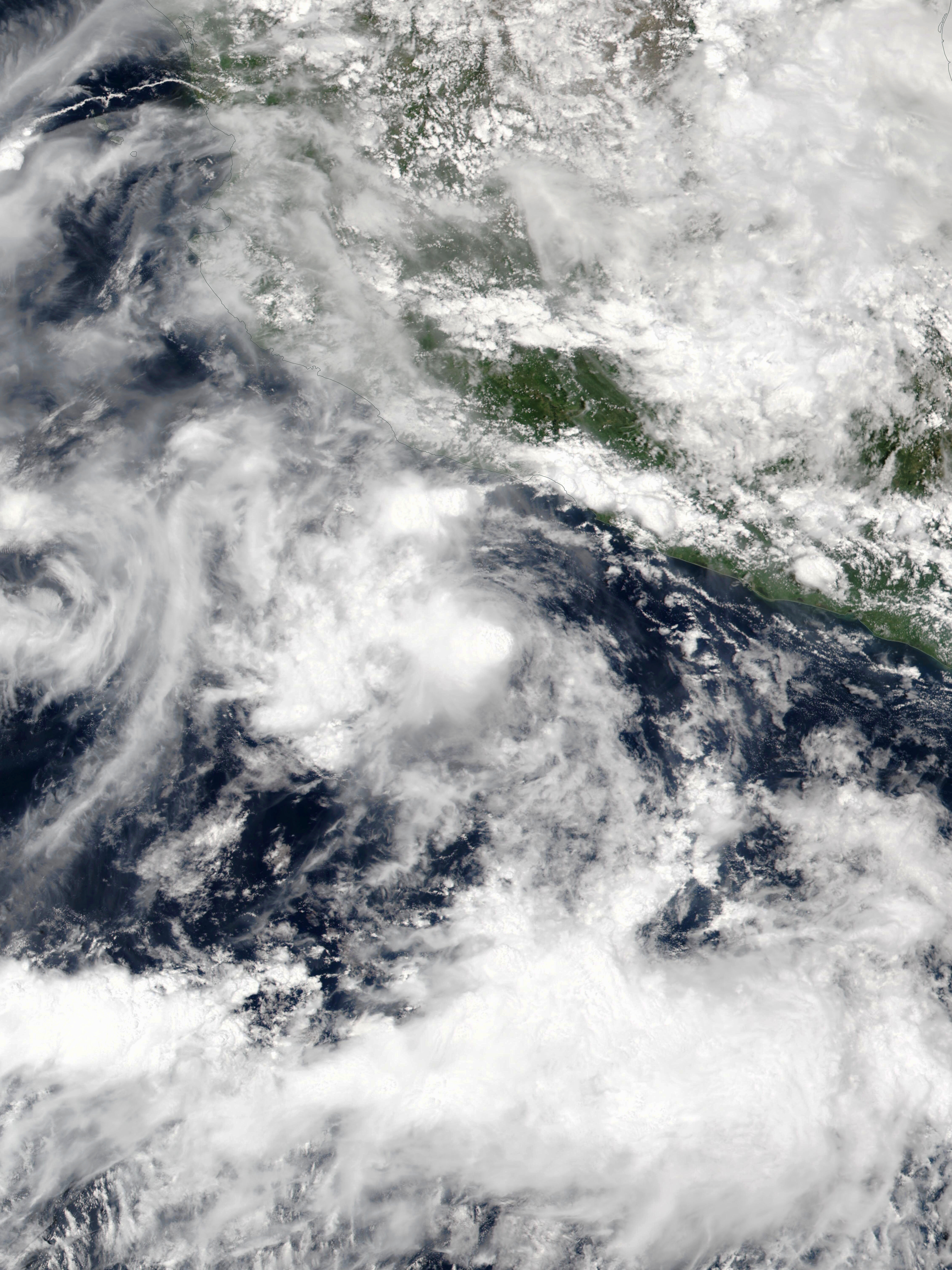
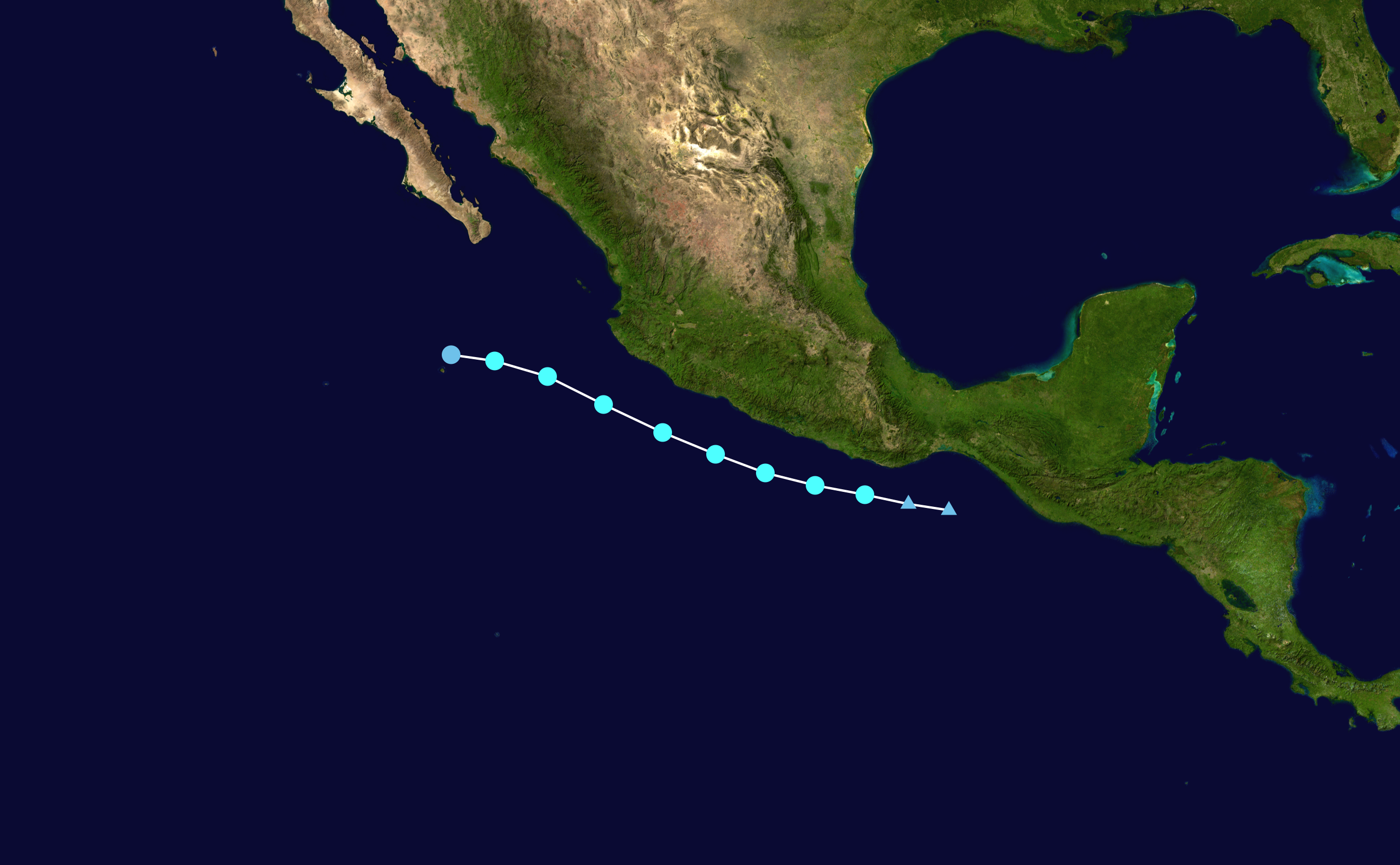
- Duration: September 5 – September 7
- Peak intensity: 45 mph (75 km/h) (1-min); 1004 mbar (hPa)

On September 3, the Atlantic's Hurricane Nana made landfall in southern Belize. It crossed Mexico over the next day, with its low-level center dissipating but its mid-level remnants continuing into the East Pacific. Plentiful convection spawned a new circulation and yielded tropical storm-force winds, resulting in the designation of Tropical Storm Julio about 85 mi (137 km) southwest of Puerto Angel, Oaxaca, at 00:00 UTC on September 5. The new storm moved unusually quick toward the west-northwest and reached peak winds of 45 mph (72 km/h) on September 6 when a concentrated burst of thunderstorms developed over its center. An uptick in easterly wind shear prevented additional development, and Julio instead opened up into a trough around 06:00 UTC on September 7. The next day, its remnants were absorbed by a broad area of low pressure southwest of Socorro Island.

=== Tropical Storm Karina ===
- Tropical storm (SSHWS)
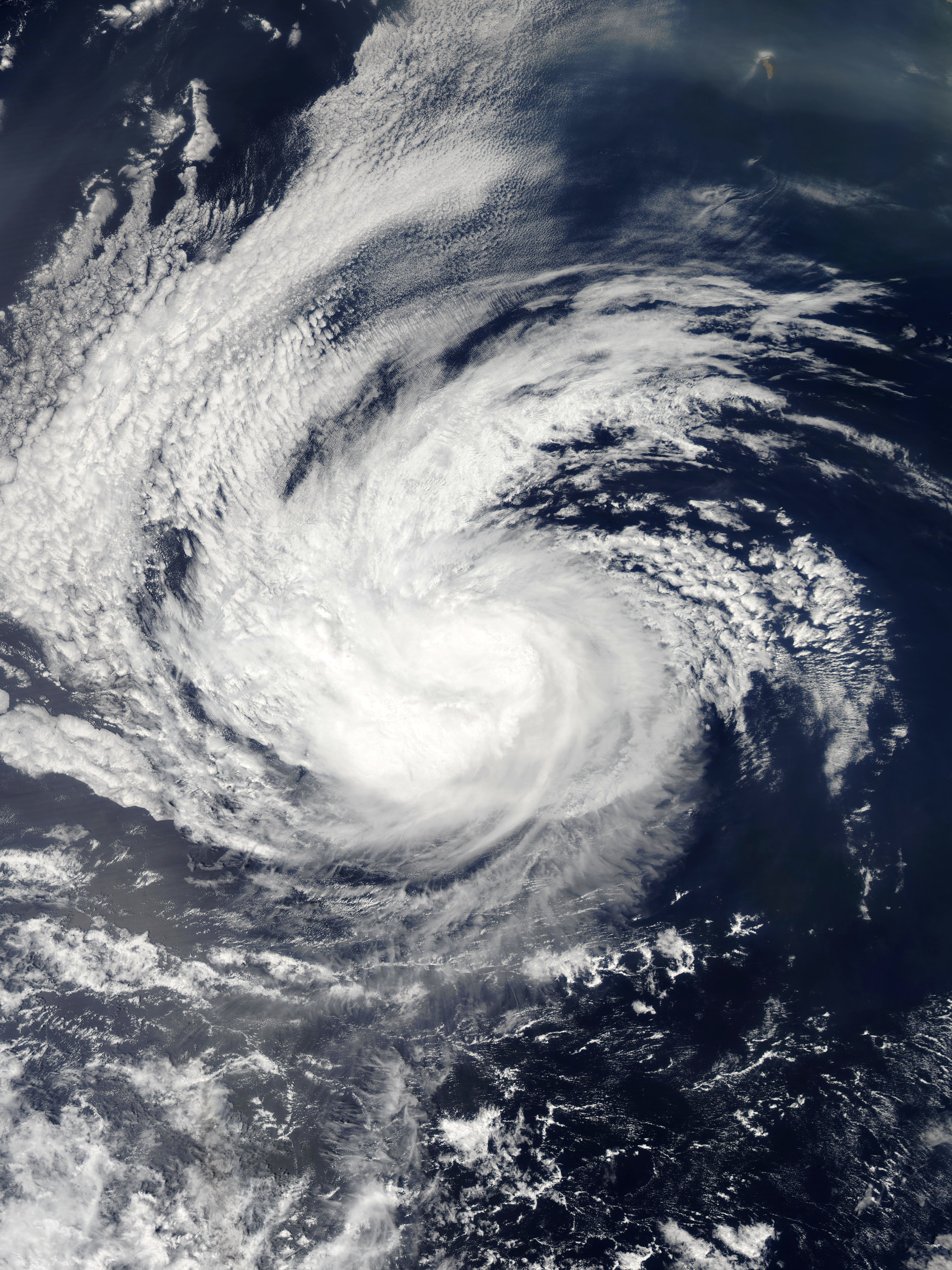
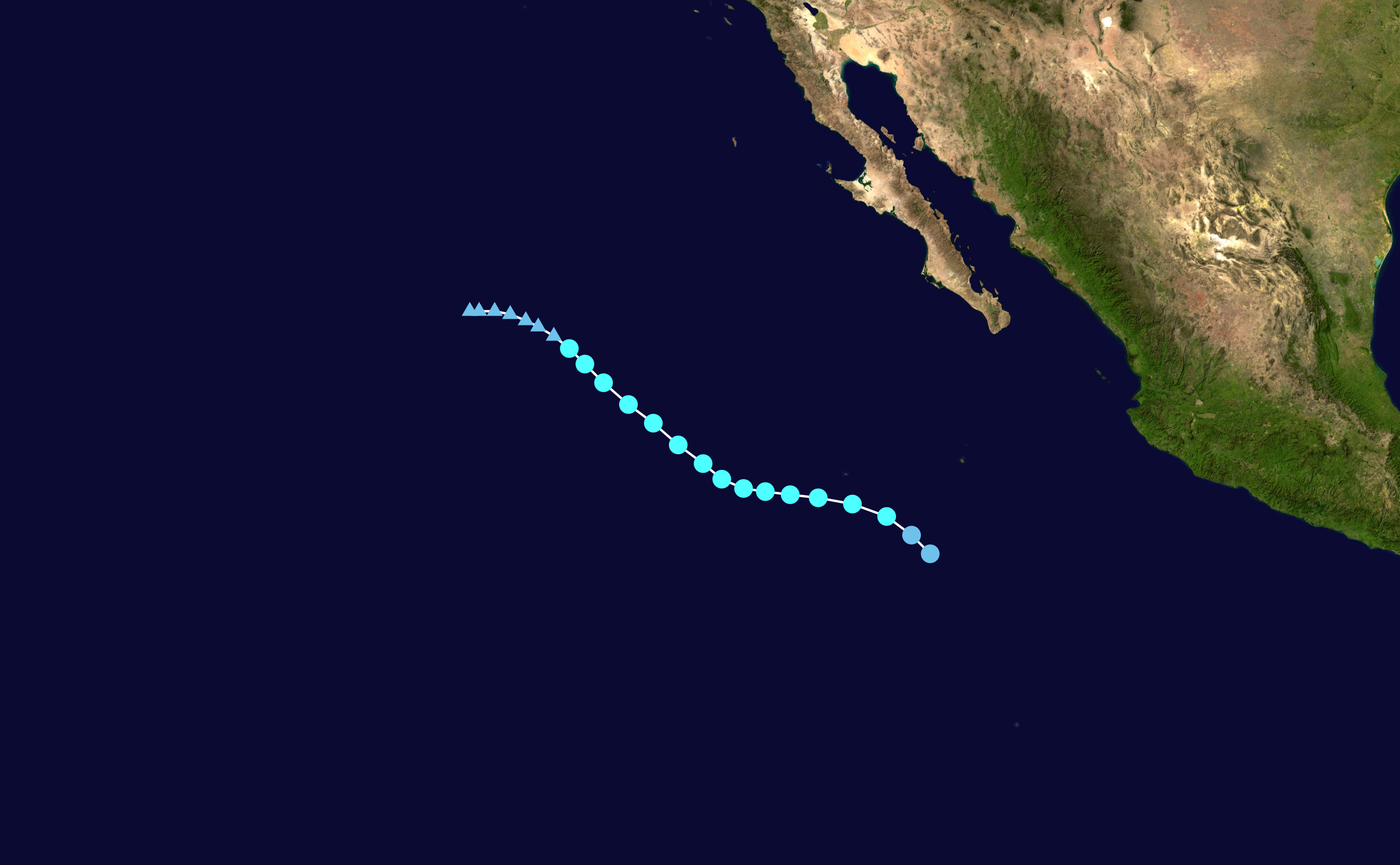
- Duration: September 12 – September 16
- Peak intensity: 60 mph (95 km/h) (1-min); 996 mbar (hPa)

A tropical wave departed Africa on August 26 and emerged into the East Pacific by September 7, where it only slowly developed. By 18:00 UTC on September 12, a new tropical depression formed about 540 mi (870 km) south-southwest of Baja California Sur. The system moved west-northwest on the southwest side of a ridge throughout its duration. In the wake of its formation, the depression struggled with northeasterly wind shear which kept the center exposed. Despite this, it intensified into Tropical Storm Karina around 06:00 UTC on September 13. Shear decreased the following day, allowing Karina to attain peak winds of 60 mph (97 km/h) on September 15. Ocean waters eventually began to decrease, causing a weakening trend that resulted in Karina's degeneration to a remnant low at 18:00 UTC on September 16. The low turned west and opened up into a trough early on September 18.

=== Tropical Storm Lowell ===
- Tropical storm (SSHWS)
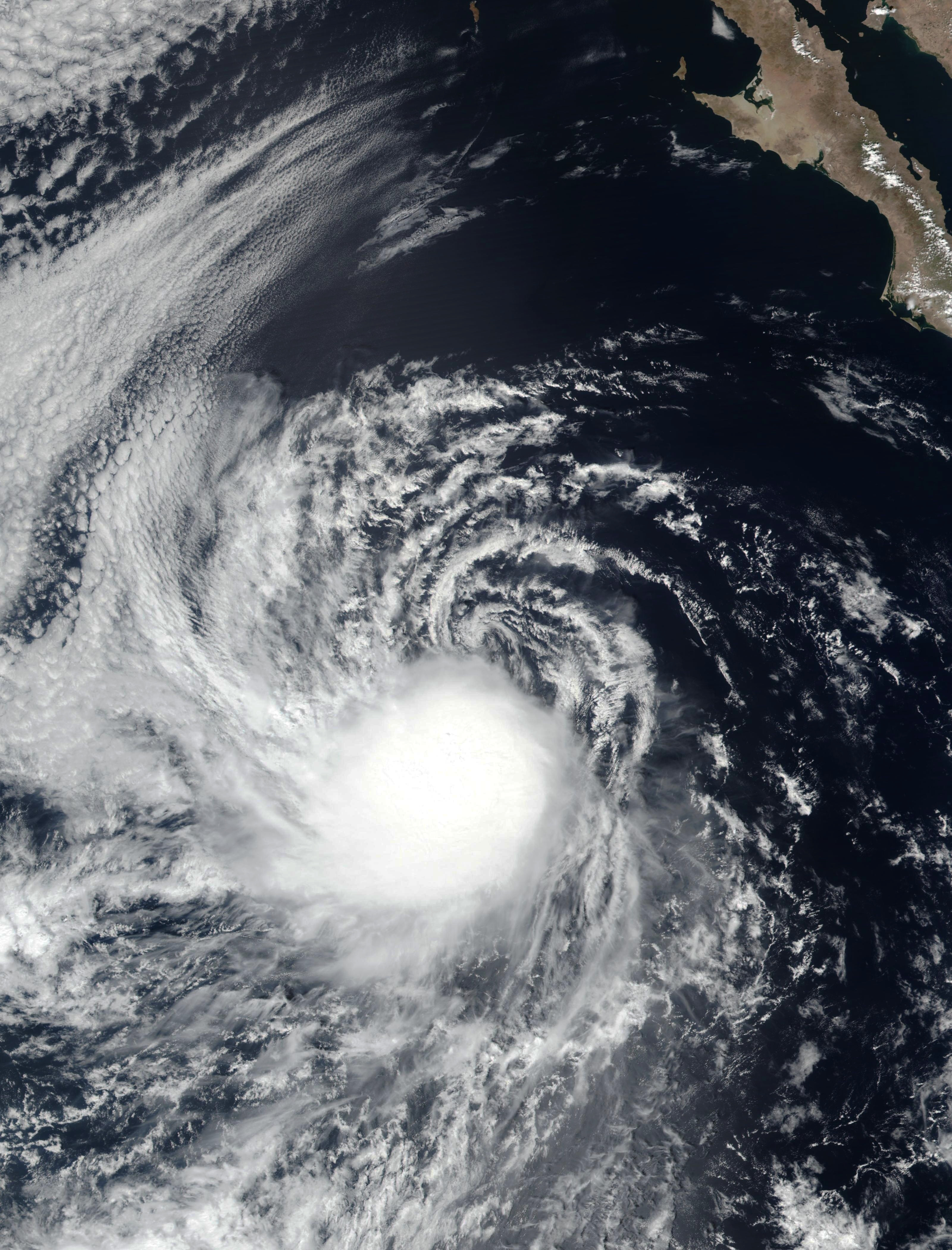
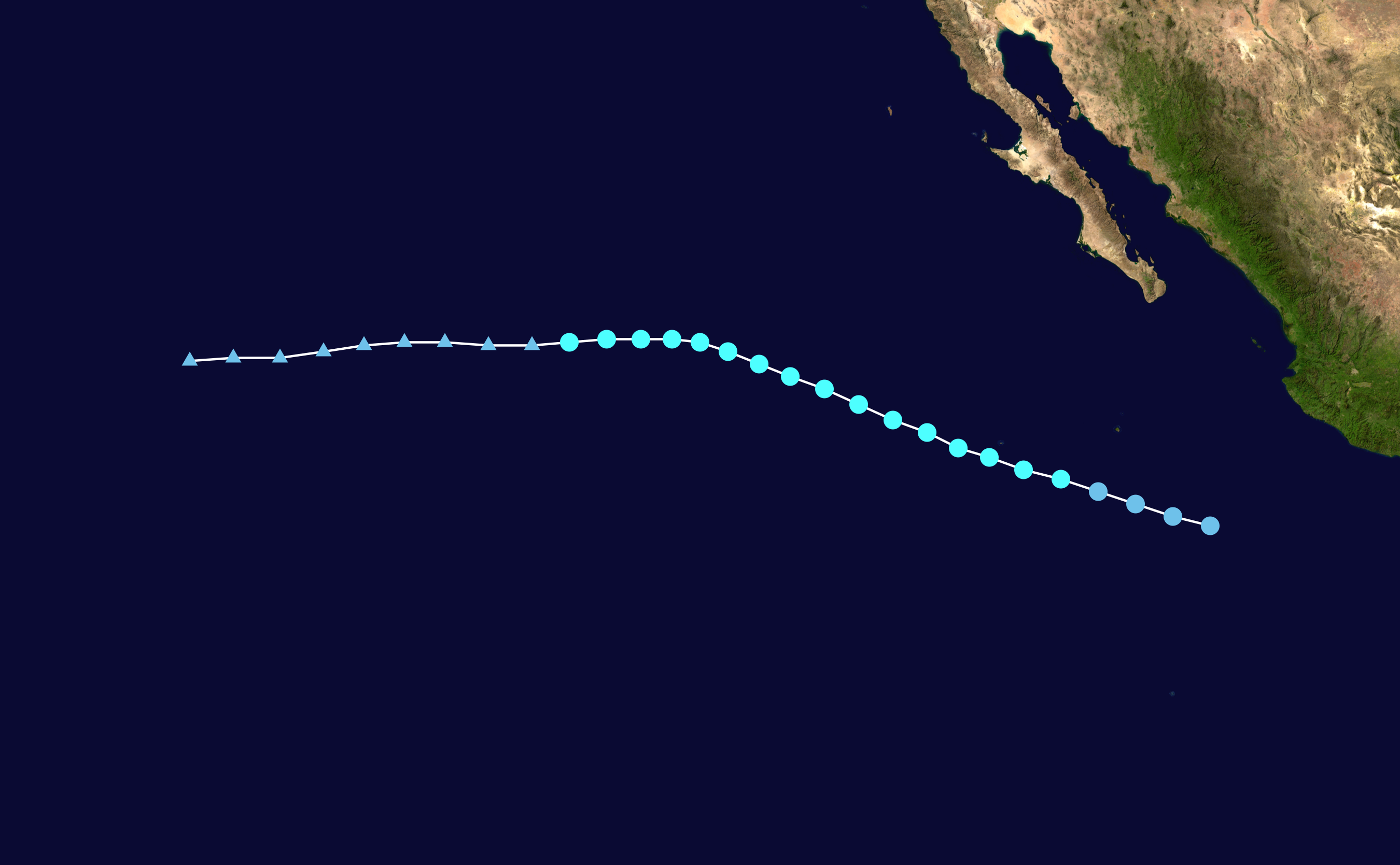
- Duration: September 20 – September 25
- Peak intensity: 50 mph (85 km/h) (1-min); 1001 mbar (hPa)

A trough developed south of the Atlantic's Tropical Storm Beta on September 18, stretching from the southwestern Gulf of Mexico into the East Pacific. A disturbance formed on the southern end of this trough, eventually organizing into a tropical depression at 18:00 UTC on September 20. It was located about 575 mi (925 km) south-southeast of Baja California Sur then. Hostile wind shear initially prevented the depression from intensifying, but it lessened somewhat on September 21, allowing the system to become Tropical Storm Lowell around 18:00 UTC that day. Lowell attained peak winds of 50 mph (80 km/h) on September 23, but it began to weaken later that day while encountering stronger wind shear and cooler ocean waters. Deep convection was gradually stripped from the cyclone's center, and Lowell degenerated to a remnant low at 18:00 UTC on September 25. The low moved west and opened up into a trough on September 28 well east of the Big Island.

=== Hurricane Marie ===
- Category 4 hurricane (SSHWS)
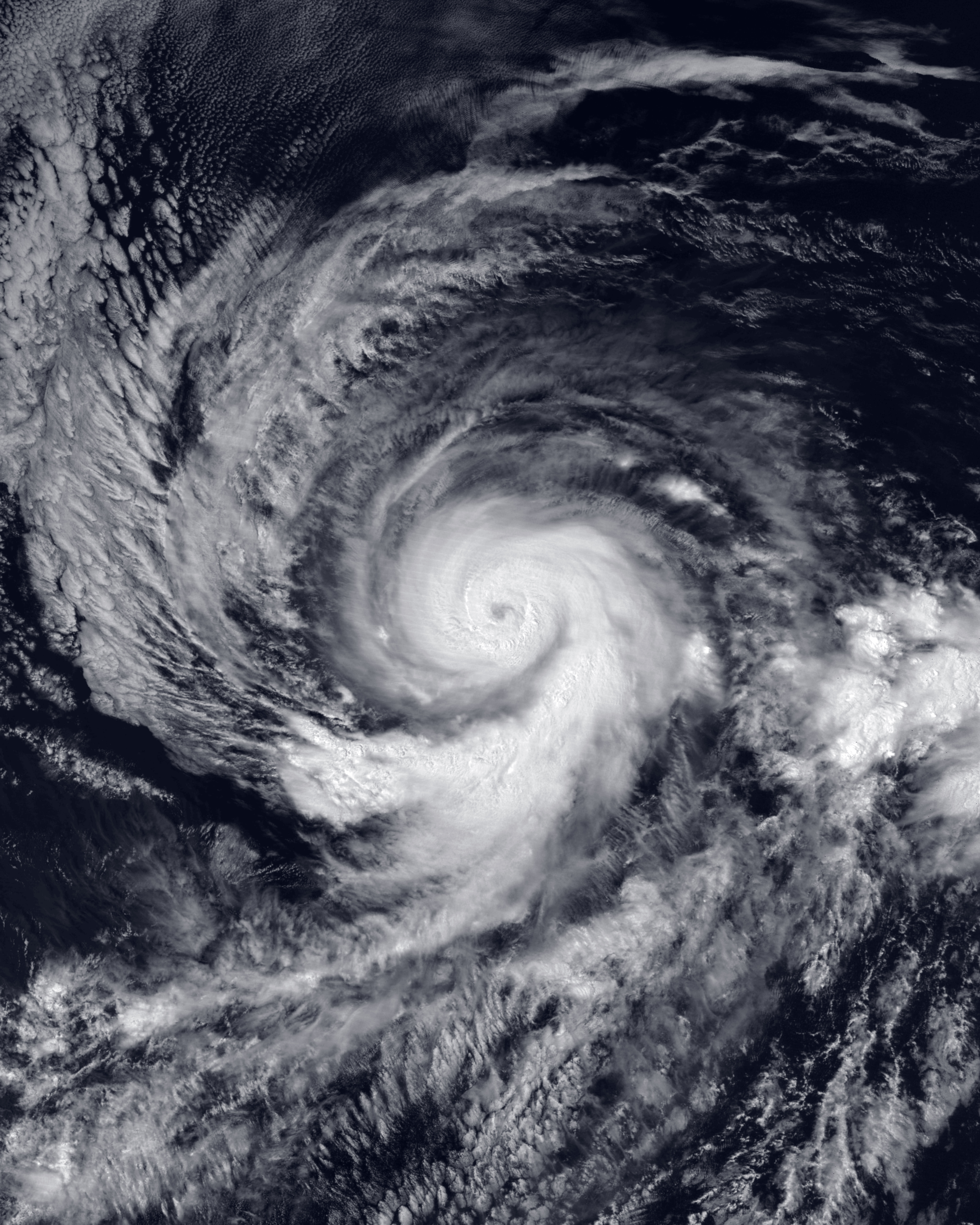
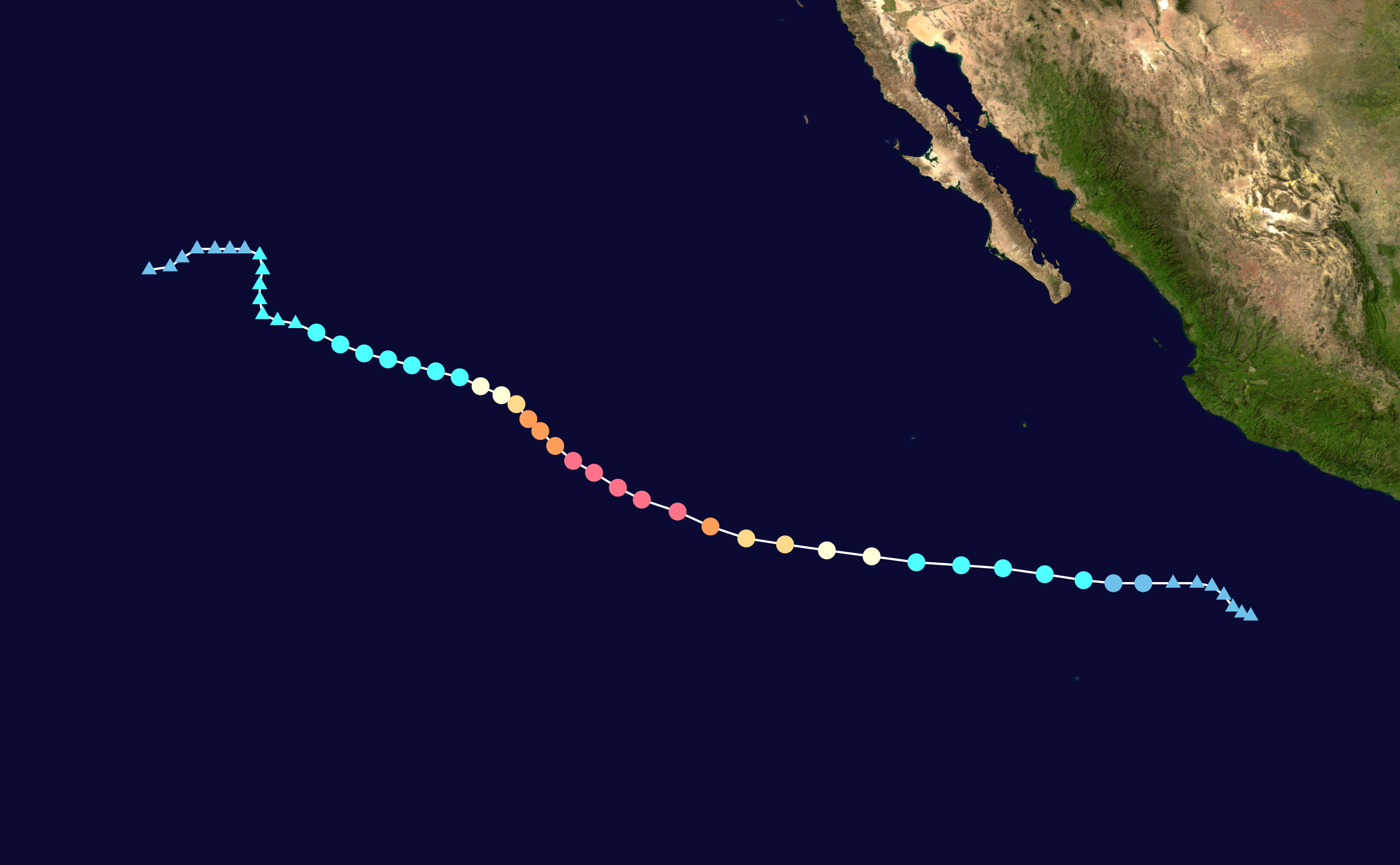
- Duration: September 29 – October 6
- Peak intensity: 140 mph (220 km/h) (1-min); 945 mbar (hPa)

A tropical wave interacted with the monsoon trough south of Mexico and an overarching CCKW, resulting in a broad disturbance on September 24. The system moved west-northwest, coalescing into a tropical depression around 06:00 UTC on September 29 while located about 415 mi (670 km) southwest of Manzanillo. Twelve hours later, it became Tropical Storm Marie. The nascent storm moved through an environment of warm ocean waters, abundant moisture, and decreasing northeasterly wind shear which facilitated its rapid organization. Marie became a hurricane at 00:00 UTC on October 1; within 30 hours, it reached its peak as a Category 4 hurricane with winds of 140 mph (230 km/h). Marie displayed a well-defined eye surrounded by cloud tops as cool as −105 °F (−75 °C) around this time. Inner core processes modulated Marie's strength for a time, but it eventually crossed into cooler waters, drier air, and higher southwesterly wind shear. These factors caused it to degenerate to a remnant low by 18:00 UTC on October 6. A brief burst of convection nudged the low northward on October 7, but the cyclone curved west-southwest and opened up into a trough three days later, just after crossing into the Central Pacific.

=== Tropical Storm Norbert ===
- Tropical storm (SSHWS)
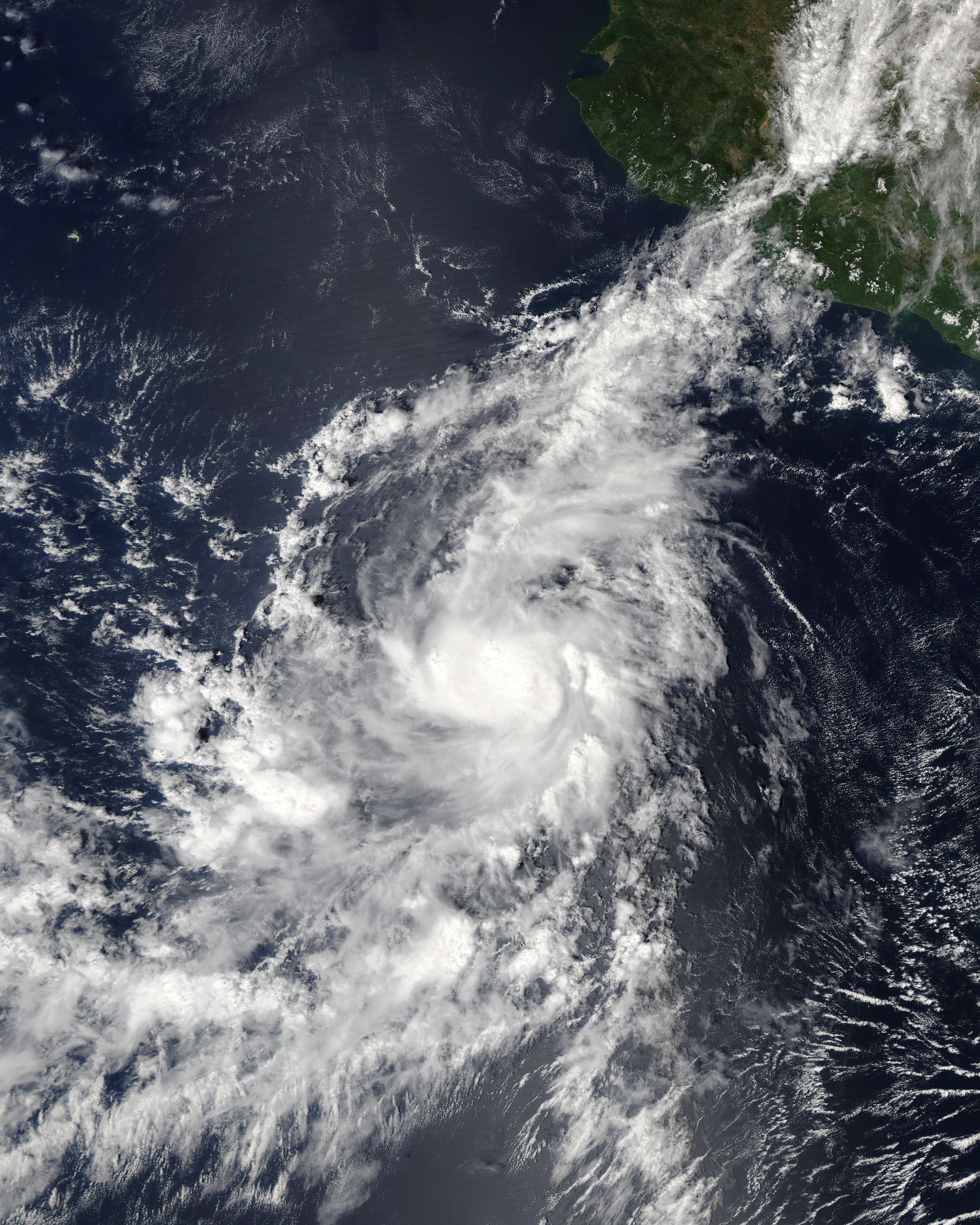
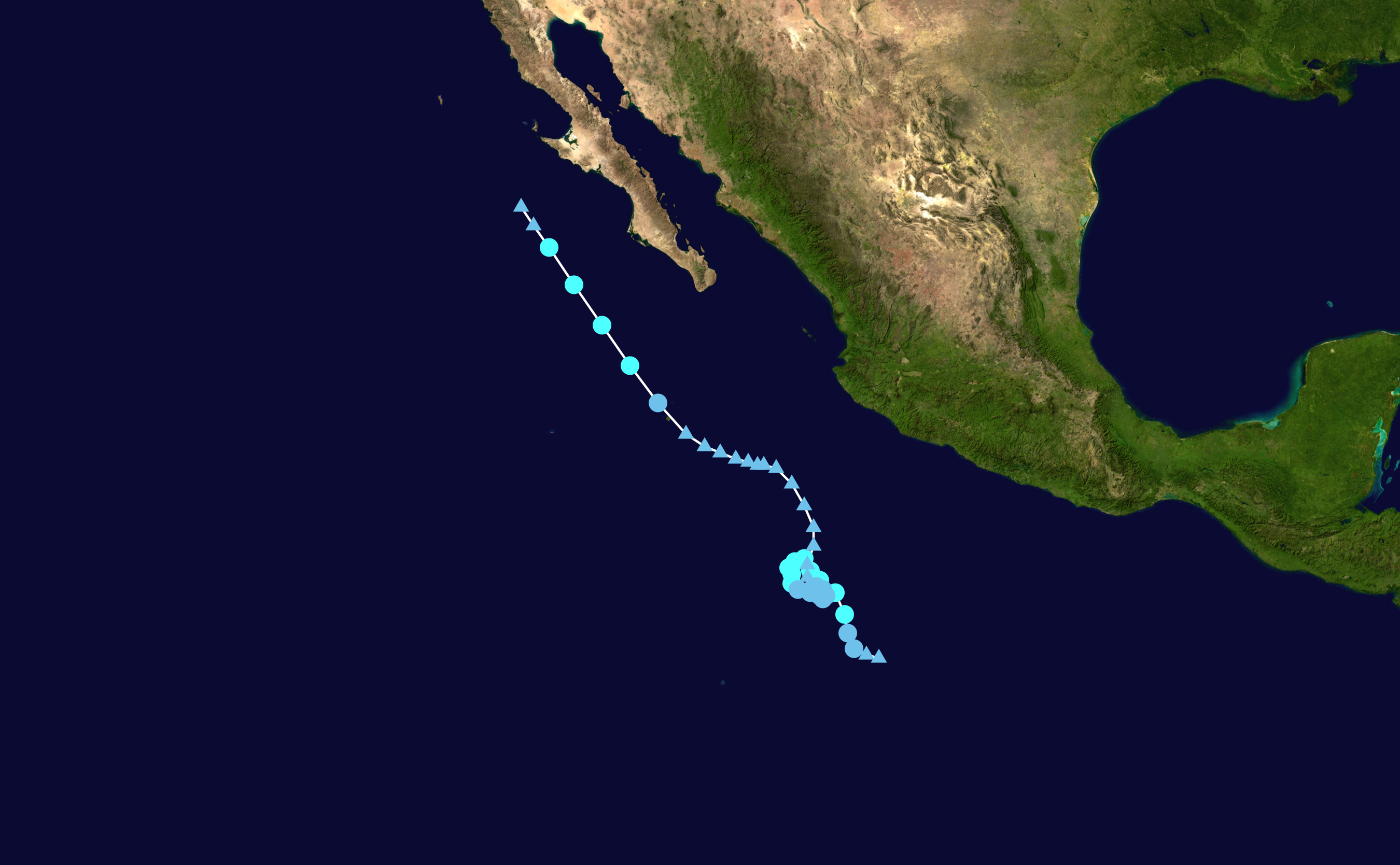
- Duration: October 5 – October 14
- Peak intensity: 60 mph (95 km/h) (1-min); 1000 mbar (hPa)

A tropical wave left Africa on September 19 and moved over Central America on September 29. It gradually became more concentrated south of Mexico, developing into a tropical depression about 635 mi (1,020 km) southwest of Acapulco at 06:00 UTC on October 5. The system moved northwest and it intensified amid favorable environmental conditions. Spiral banding increased near the center, signaling its intensification to Tropical Storm Norbert twelve hours after formation. Norbert attained peak winds of 60 mph (97 km/h) on October 6, but it encountered drier air and increasing westerly wind shear. Convection burst intermittently over subsequent days, but the cyclone weakened as it underwent a cyclonic loop. Around 00:00 UTC on October 10, the system opened up into a trough south of Manzanillo.

The remnants of Norbert moved generally northwest and continued to face unfavorable wind shear. However, sporadic bursts of convection led to a new mid-level center and eventually a surface one as well. These features aligned, and thunderstorm activity increased, leading to Norbert's redesignation as a tropical depression near 18:00 UTC on October 13. It regained tropical storm status and reached a secondary peak of 45 mph (72 km/h) on October 14. Just as its previous stint as a tropical cyclone, though, the cyclone encountered hostile conditions and began to weaken. It degenerated to a remnant low near 00:00 UTC on October 15 and dissipated less than 12 hours later to the west of Baja California Sur.

=== Tropical Storm Odalys ===
- Tropical storm (SSHWS)
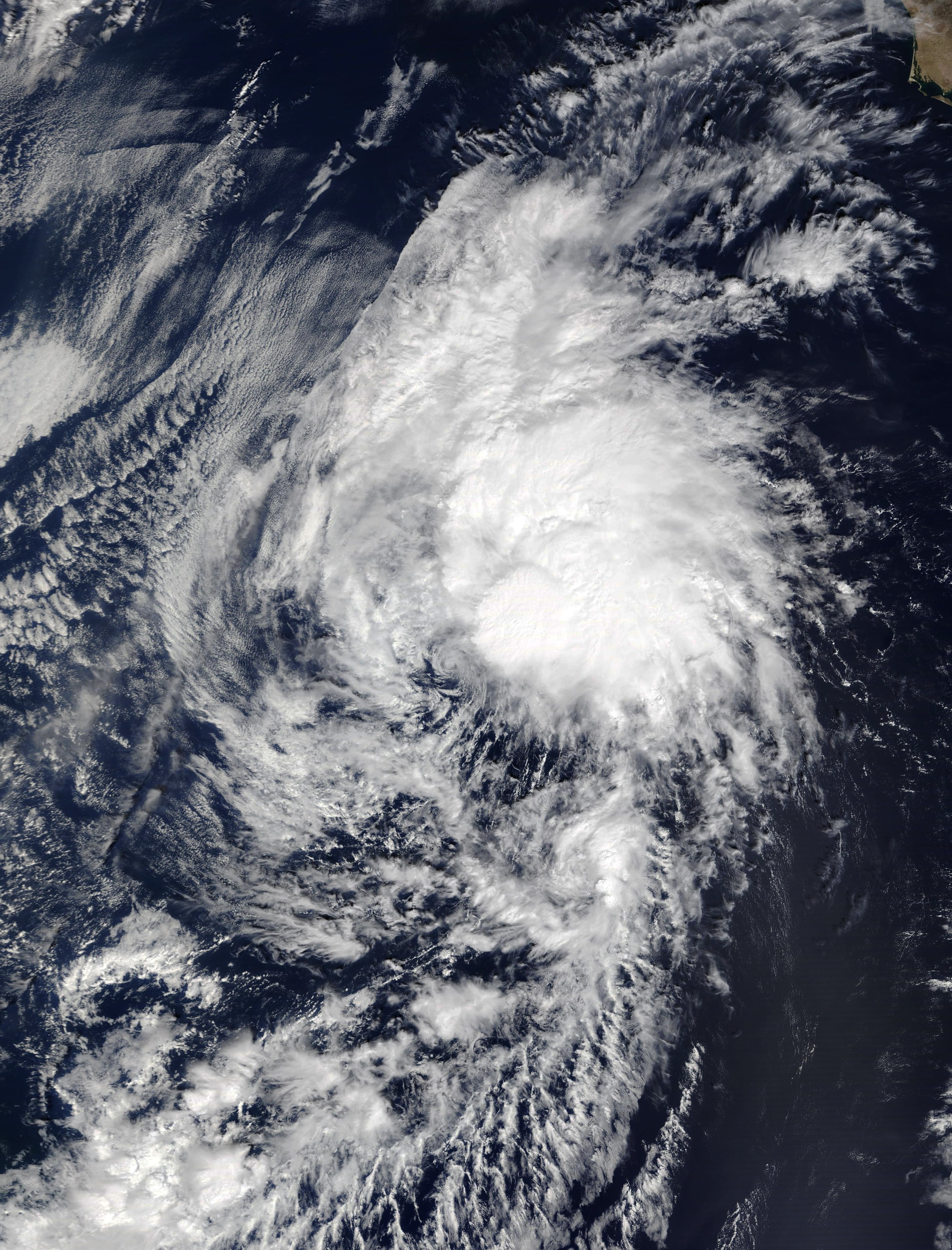
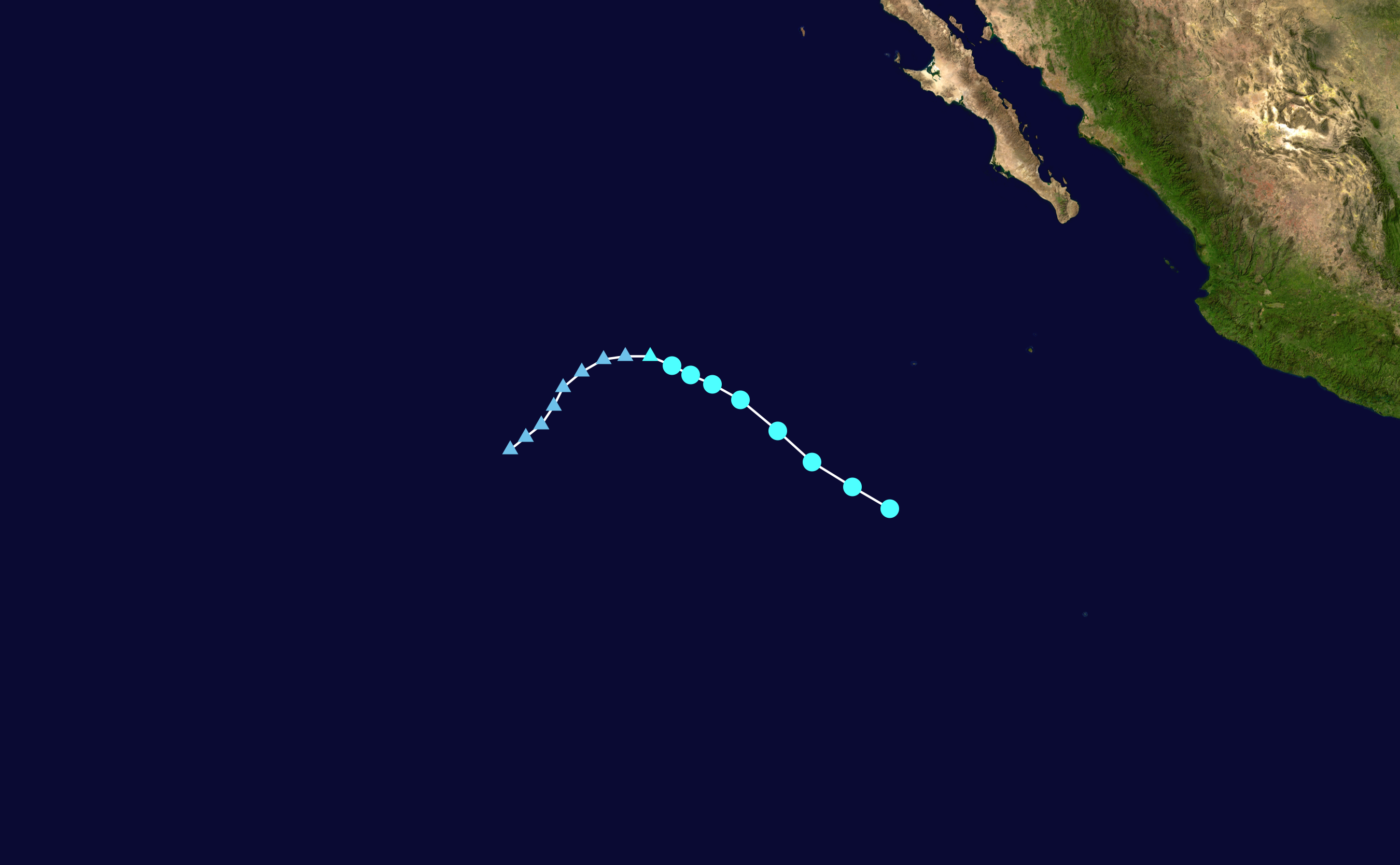
- Duration: November 3 – November 5
- Peak intensity: 50 mph (85 km/h) (1-min); 1000 mbar (hPa)

A tropical wave passed over Central America and entered the Eastern Pacific basin on October 29. Its associated thunderstorm activity remained relatively disorganized until November 1, when a broad area of low pressure developed within the system. By 18:00 UTC on November 3, the NHC determined the system was sufficiently organized to be designated Tropical Storm Odalys while it was centered about 730 mi (1,170 km) southwest of Baja California Sur. Odalys intensified somewhat over the next few days while moving west-northwest despite strong wind shear and dry air impinging on the system. At 00:00 UTC on November 5, the system reached its peak intensity with winds of 50 mph (80 km/h). Wind shear increased further shortly afterwards, causing Odalys to weaken quickly and eventually become a post-tropical cyclone at 18:00 UTC on November 5. Its shallow remnants turned southwest under the influence of a strong high-pressure area and dissipated by November 8.

=== Tropical Storm Polo ===
- Tropical storm (SSHWS)
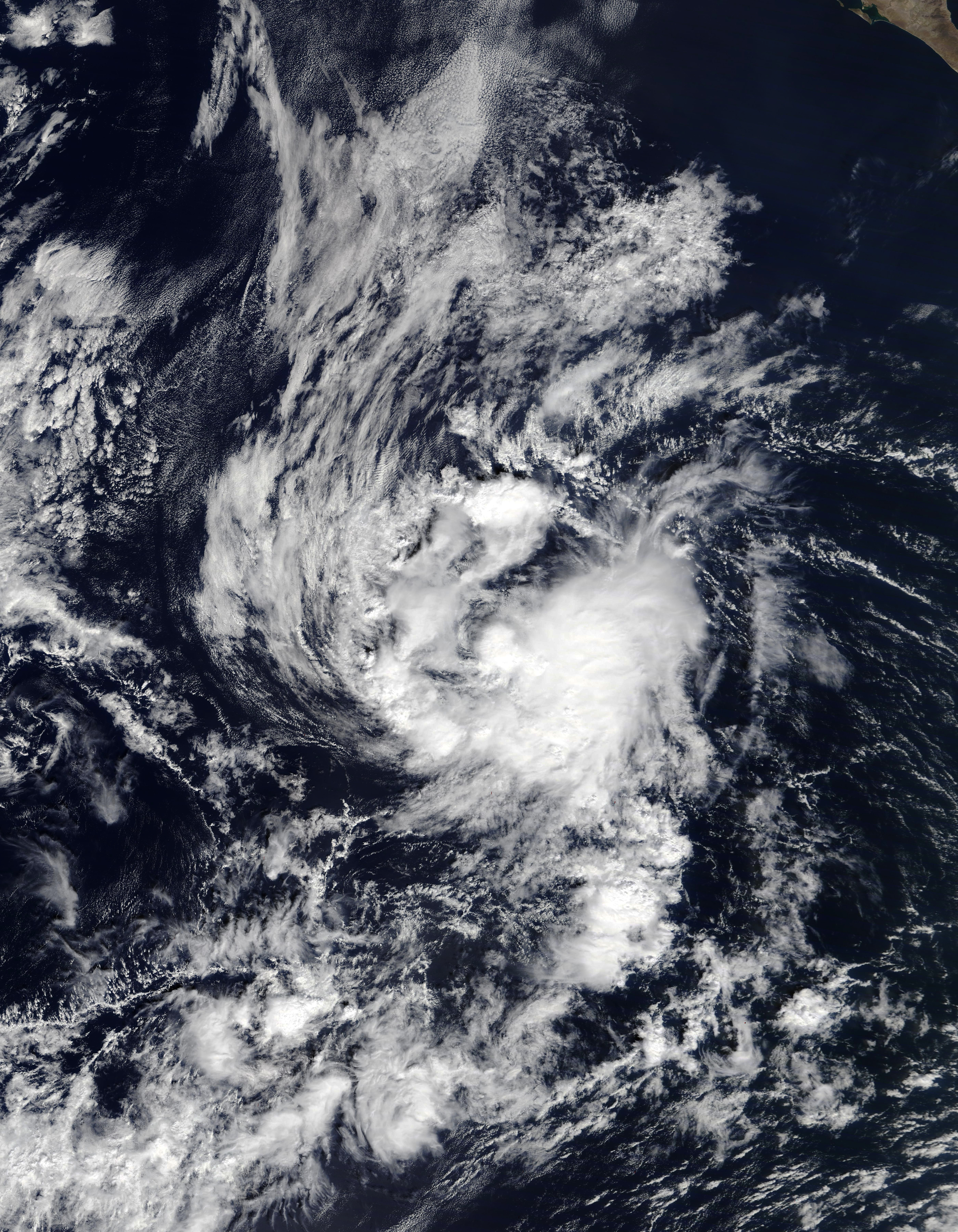
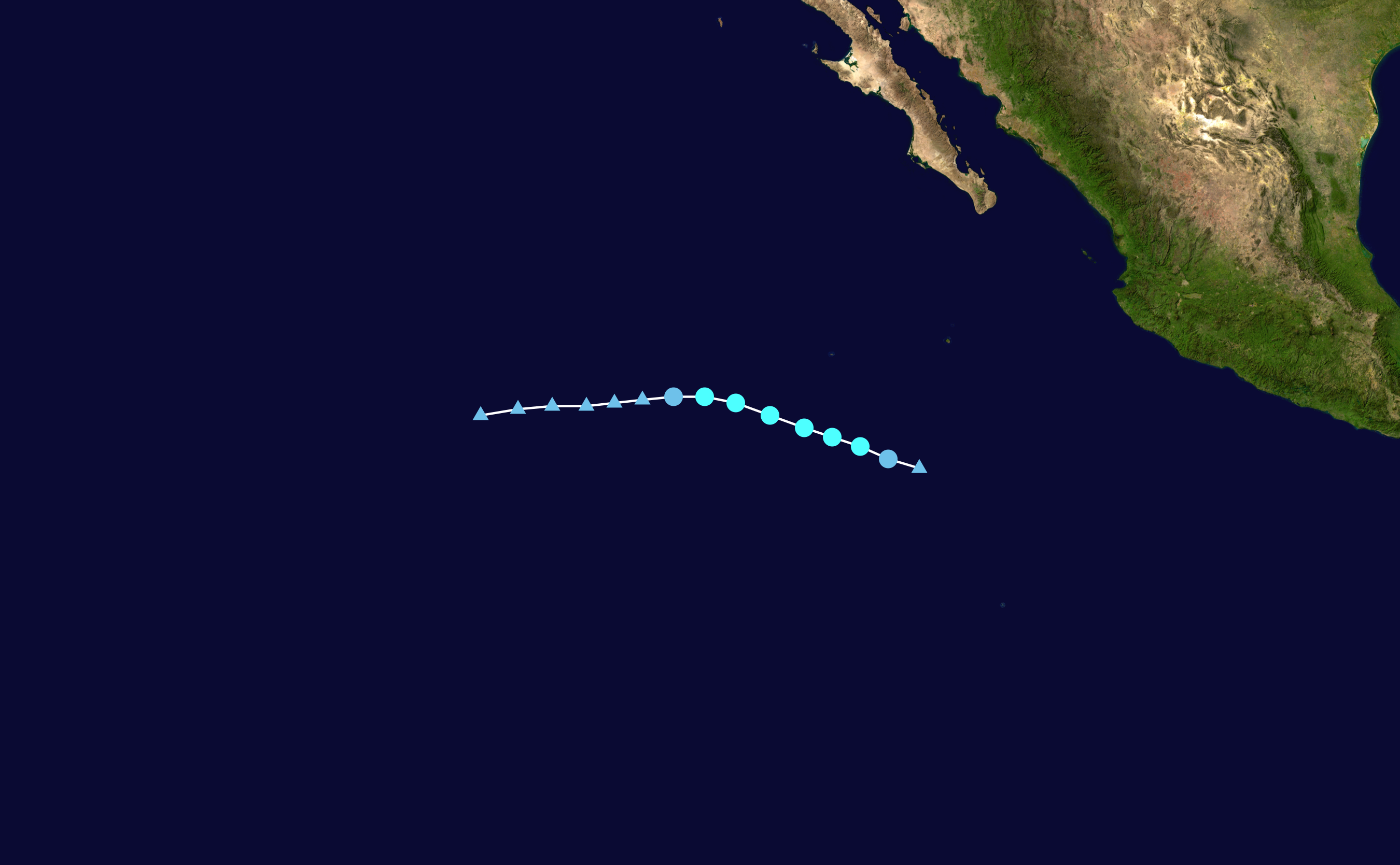
- Duration: November 17 – November 19
- Peak intensity: 45 mph (75 km/h) (1-min); 1004 mbar (hPa)

The season's final storm developed from an area of convection within the monsoon trough that may have been enhanced by a Gulf of Tehuantepec gap wind event over preceding days. On November 14, a broad area of low pressure formed. Both the low and associated thunderstorm activity gained cohesion over the coming days, resulting in the formation of a tropical depression around 18:00 UTC on November 17 to the southwest of Baja California Sur. The depression intensified into Tropical Storm Polo six hours later and reached peak winds of 45 mph (72 km/h) the following morning. As the system moved west-northwest, it encountered an increasingly hostile environment, and Polo weakened to a tropical depression early on November 19. By 18:00 UTC that day, the cyclone degenerated to a remnant area of low pressure that moved west and then west-southwest prior to dissipating into an open trough on November 21.

== Storm names ==
The following list of names was used for named storms that formed in the North Pacific Ocean east of 140°W during 2020. This is the same list used for the 2014 season, with the exception of the name Odalys, which replaced Odile. The name Odalys was used for the first time this year. No names were retired following the season, and this list is currently being used for the 2026 season.

- Amanda
- Boris *
- Cristina
- Douglas *
- Elida
- Fausto
- Genevieve
- Hernan
- Iselle
- Julio
- Karina
- Lowell
- Marie
- Norbert
- Odalys
- Polo
- Rachel (unused)
- Simon (unused)
- Trudy (unused)
- Vance (unused)
- Winnie (unused)
- Xavier (unused)
- Yolanda (unused)
- Zeke (unused)

For storms that form in the North Pacific from 140°W to the International Date Line, the names come from a series of four rotating lists. Names are used one after the other without regard to year, and when the bottom of one list is reached, the next named storm receives the name at the top of the next list. No storms formed within the area in 2020. Named storms in the table above that crossed into the area during the season are noted (*).

== Season effects ==
This is a table of all of the storms that formed in the 2020 Pacific hurricane season. It includes their name, duration (within the basin), peak classification and intensities, areas affected, damage, and death totals. Deaths in parentheses are additional and indirect (an example of an indirect death would be a traffic accident), but were still related to that storm. Damage and deaths include totals while the storm was extratropical, a wave, or a low, and all of the damage figures are in 2020 USD.

Saffir–Simpson scale
TD	TS	C1	C2	C3	C4	C5

2020 Pacific hurricane season statistics
Storm name	Dates active	Storm category at peak intensity	Max 1-min wind mph (km/h)	Min. press. (mbar)	Areas affected	Damage (US$)	Deaths	Ref(s).
One-E	April 25 – 26	Tropical depression	35 (55)	1006	None	None	None	
Amanda	May 30 – 31	Tropical storm	40 (65)	1003	Guatemala, El Salvador, Honduras, Belize, Costa Rica, Southern Mexico, Yucatán Peninsula	≥$200 million	40	
Boris	June 24 – 27	Tropical storm	40 (65)	1005	None	None	None	
Four-E	June 29 – 30	Tropical depression	30 (45)	1006	None	None	None	
Cristina	July 6 – 12	Tropical storm	70 (110)	993	Socorro Island	None	None	
Six-E	July 13 – 14	Tropical depression	35 (55)	1007	Central America	None	None	
Unnamed	July 20 – 21	Tropical storm	40 (65)	1006	None	None	None	
Douglas	July 20 – 28	Category 4 hurricane	130 (215)	954	Hawaii	Minimal	None	
Elida	August 8 – 12	Category 2 hurricane	105 (165)	971	Southwestern Mexico, Socorro Island	None	None	
Ten-E	August 13 – 16	Tropical depression	35 (55)	1004	None	None	None	
Fausto	August 16 – 17	Tropical storm	40 (65)	1004	Northern California	None	None	
Genevieve	August 16 – 21	Category 4 hurricane	130 (215)	950	Southwestern Mexico, Socorro Island, Baja California Peninsula, Southern California	$50 million	6	
Hernan	August 26 – 28	Tropical storm	45 (75)	1001	Mexico, Baja California Peninsula	$51.4 million	1	
Iselle	August 26 – 30	Tropical storm	60 (95)	997	Clarion Island	None	None	
Julio	September 5 – 7	Tropical storm	45 (75)	1004	Southwestern Mexico	None	None	
Karina	September 12 – 16	Tropical storm	60 (95)	996	None	None	None	
Lowell	September 20 – 25	Tropical storm	50 (85)	1001	Clarion Island	None	None	
Marie	September 29 – October 6	Category 4 hurricane	140 (220)	945	None	None	None	
Norbert	October 5 – 14	Tropical storm	60 (95)	1000	None	None	None	
Odalys	November 3 – 5	Tropical storm	50 (85)	1000	None	None	None	
Polo	November 17 – 19	Tropical storm	45 (75)	1004	None	None	None	
Season aggregates
21 systems	April 25 – November 19		140 (220)	945		≥$301.4 million	47	

== See also ==
- Tropical cyclones in 2020
- Weather of 2020
- 2020 Atlantic hurricane season
- 2020 Pacific typhoon season
- 2020 North Indian Ocean cyclone season
- South-West Indian Ocean cyclone seasons: 2019–20, 2020–21
- Australian region cyclone seasons: 2019–20, 2020–21
- South Pacific cyclone seasons: 2019–20, 2020–21
