= Wayne Arthurs =

Wayne Arthurs may refer to:

- Wayne Arthurs (politician) (born 1948), member of the Legislative Assembly of Ontario
- Wayne Arthurs (tennis) (born 1971), Australian tennis player

== See also ==
- Arthur Wayne, alias of 2019 Joker film character Arthur Fleck
- Wayne (disambiguation)
- Arthurs (disambiguation)
