= Arthur (disambiguation) =

Arthur is a common masculine given name, including a list of persons and fictional characters with the name.

Arthur may also refer to:

== People ==
- Arthur (surname), for people and fictional characters with the surname.

People known by the mononym include:

- King Arthur, legendary British monarch
- Arthur Melo, Brazilian footballer known simply as Arthur
- Arthur (footballer, born 2003) (Arthur Augusto de Matos Soares), Brazilian footballer
- Arthur (footballer, born 2005) (Arthur Wenderroscky Sanches), Brazilian footballer
- Arthur I of Brittany (1187–1203)
- Arthur II of Brittany (1261–1312)
- Arthur III of Brittany (1393–1458)
- Arthur, Prince of Wales (1486–1502)
- Prince Arthur, Duke of Connaught and Strathearn (1850–1942), seventh child of Queen Victoria
- Prince Arthur of Connaught (1883–1938), a grandson of Queen Victoria
- Arthur (TV presenter) (born 1966), French presenter, producer, and comedian

== Arts and entertainment ==
=== Music ===
- Arthur (band), a side project of MxPx
- Arthur (magazine), publication devoted to avant-garde music
- Arthur (Or the Decline and Fall of the British Empire), a 1969 album by The Kinks
  - "Arthur" (The Kinks song)
- "Arthur" (Badfinger song)
- Arthur the King, a 2001 album by Maddy Prior
- "Arthur", a track of Rick Wakeman's album The Myths and Legends of King Arthur

=== Characters ===
- Arthur (plant), a running gag in MAD Magazine
- Arthur le fantôme justicier, a character in the comics of Jean Cézard
- Sir Arthur (Ghosts 'n Goblins), the main character of Ghosts 'n Goblins video game series
- Arthur (Soulcalibur), a minor character in the Soulcalibur video game
- Arthur (The Tick), the sidekick of superhero The Tick
- Arthur the Artificial Intelligence, a character from the Journeyman Project computer games
- Arthur the chimpanzee, from Lillian Hoban's children's books

=== Film and television ===
- Arthur (TV series), an animated children's television series based on the Arthur Read character
- Arthur (1981 film), an Oscar-winning 1981 film starring Dudley Moore
  - Arthur 2: On the Rocks, a 1988 sequel
  - Arthur (2011 film), a 2011 remake starring Russell Brand
- King Arthur (2004 film), a 2004 film
- Arthur! and the Square Knights of the Round Table, an Australian animated series
- King Arthur and the Knights of Justice (TV series)
- King Arthur's Disasters, a British animated series
- Arthur and the Great Adventure:
  - Arthur and the Invisibles, a 2006 animated film
  - Arthur and the Revenge of Maltazard, a 2009 animated film
  - Arthur 3: The War of the Two Worlds, a 2010 animated film
- Arthur Christmas, a 2011 animated film
- Arthur the King, a 2024 film

=== Other uses in arts and entertainment ===
- Arthur (Brown book series), a children's educational publications by Marc Brown
- Arthur (Besson book series), a franchise of children's media based on works by Luc Besson
- Arthur, 1989 novel by Stephen R. Lawhead, the third in the Pendragon Cycle
- Arthur: The Quest for Excalibur, a 1989 computer game made by Infocom

== Places ==
=== Australia ===
- Port Arthur, Tasmania

=== Canada ===
- Arthur (electoral district), Manitoba, former provincial electoral division
- Arthur, Ontario
- Port Arthur, Ontario
- Rural Municipality of Arthur, Manitoba

=== China ===
- Port Arthur, the former name of Lüshunkou

=== New Zealand ===
- Arthur's Pass, a township in the Southern Alps of the South Island

=== United States ===
- Arthur, Illinois
- Arthur, Indiana
- Arthur, Iowa
- Arthur, Missouri
- Arthur, Nebraska
- Arthur, Nevada
- Arthur, North Dakota
- Arthur, Ohio
- Arthur, Tennessee
- Arthur, West Virginia
- Arthur, Wisconsin, a town
- Arthur, Grant County, Wisconsin, an unincorporated community
- Arthur County, Nebraska
- Arthur Township (disambiguation)
- Port Arthur, Texas
- Port Arthur, Wisconsin, an unincorporated community

== Other uses ==
- 2597 Arthur, an asteroid
- Arthur (dog), an Ecuadorian street dog
- Arthur (newspaper), a student newspaper at Trent University, Canada
- Arthur (operating system)
- ARTHUR, ARTillery HUnting Radar
- Arthur Retail, company, acquired by JDA Software in 1998
- Arthur, the first open parabolic satellite dish, at the Goonhilly Satellite Earth Station
- List of storms named Arthur

== See also ==
- Arthur's, a 19th-century British gentlemen's club
- "Arthur's Theme (Best That You Can Do)", 1981 song by Christopher Cross
- Arthur's Magazine, a 19th-century American literary magazine
- Arthurs (disambiguation)
- Clan Arthur, a Scottish clan
- King Arthur (disambiguation)
- Tropical Storm Arthur
- Arturo (disambiguation)
- Artur
- Author
