= Arthur Fleming =

Arthur Fleming may refer to:

- Art Fleming (Arthur Fleming Fazzin, 1924–1995), American actor and television host
- Arthur H. Fleming (1856–1940), Canadian-American lumber operator and philanthropist
- Arthur Fleming (electrical engineer) (1881–1960), English electrical engineer, researcher director, and engineering educator
- Arthur Fleming-Sandes (1894–1961), British recipient of the Victoria Cross for action in WWI
- Richard Arthur Fleming, American travel writer, brother of Katherine Elizabeth Fleming

== See also ==
- Arthur Flemming (1905–1996), American government official
- Arthur S. Flemming Award, award recognizing outstanding U.S. federal employees
- Arthur F. Andrews (Arthur Fleming Andrews, 1876–1930), American cyclist
- Arthur Fleming Morrell (1788–1880), British naval officer and explorer
- Fleming (disambiguation)
- Arthur (disambiguation)
