= Timeline of the 2020 Atlantic hurricane season =

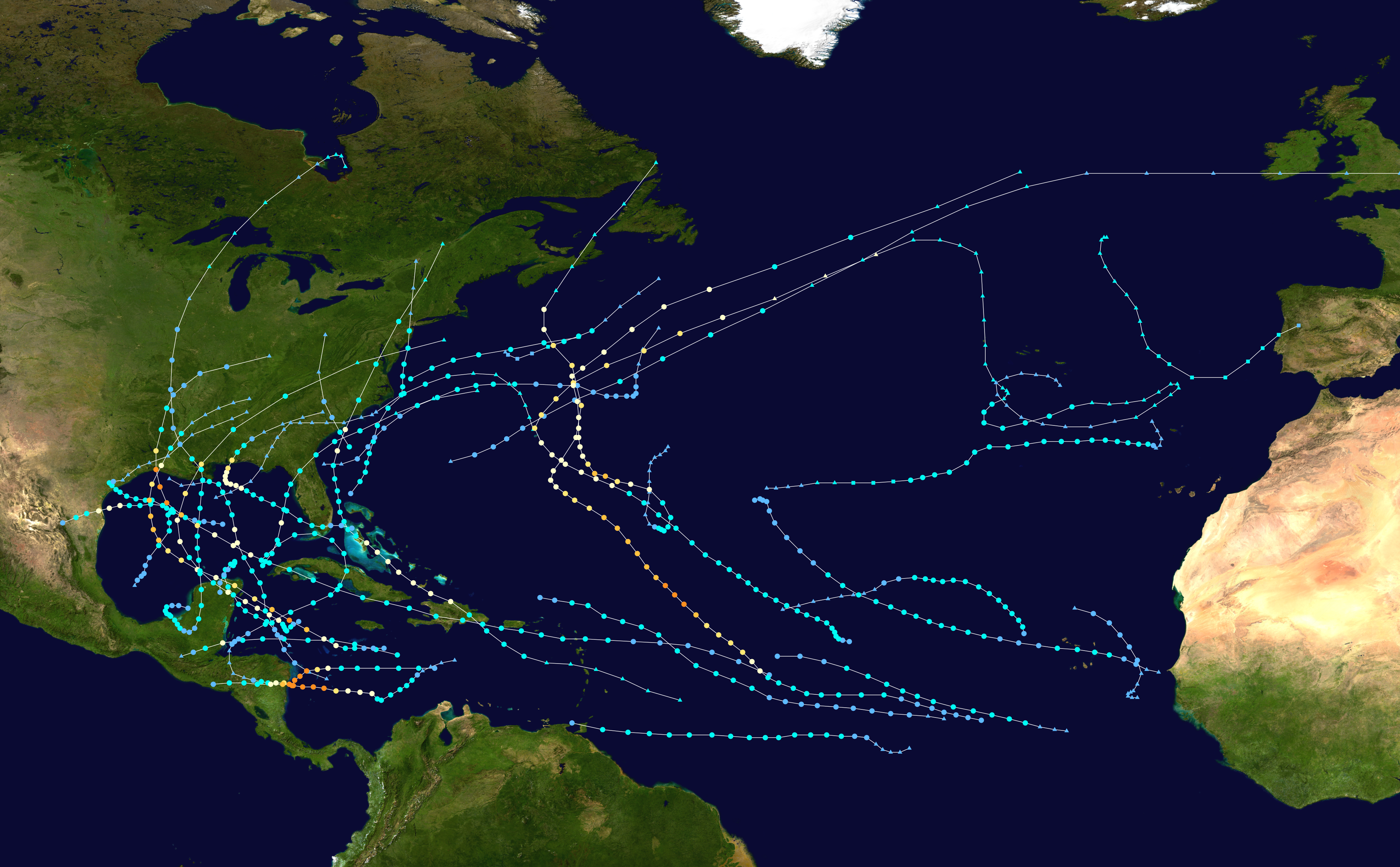
- Season summary map

Season boundaries
- First system formed: May 16, 2020
- Last system dissipated: November 18, 2020

Strongest system
- Name: Iota
- Maximum winds: 155 mph (250 km/h)
- Lowest pressure: 917 mbar (hPa; 27.08 inHg)

Longest lasting system
- Name: Paulette
- Duration: 15 days
Storm articles
- Tropical Storm Arthur (2020)
- Tropical Storm Bertha (2020)
- Tropical Storm Cristobal (2020)
- Tropical Storm Fay (2020)
- Hurricane Hanna (2020)
- Hurricane Isaias
- Hurricane Laura
- Hurricane Marco (2020)
- Hurricane Nana (2020)
- Hurricane Paulette
- Hurricane Sally
- Hurricane Teddy
- Subtropical Storm Alpha (2020)
- Tropical Storm Beta (2020)
- Hurricane Gamma
- Hurricane Delta
- Hurricane Epsilon (2020)
- Hurricane Zeta
- Hurricane Eta
- Hurricane Iota

The 2020 Atlantic hurricane season was the most active Atlantic hurricane season on record in terms of number of named storms. Additionally, it was an above-average season for tropical cyclones for the fifth consecutive year. (Note: An average Atlantic hurricane season, as defined by the National Oceanic and Atmospheric Administration, has 12 tropical storms, six hurricanes, and two major hurricanes.) The season officially began on June 1, 2020, and ended on November 30, 2020. These dates, adopted by convention, historically delimit the period each year when most Atlantic tropical systems form. However, storm formation is possible at any time of the year, as was the case this season, when its first two named storms, Tropical Storm Arthur and Tropical Storm Bertha, formed on May 16 and May 27, respectively. The final storm, Hurricane Iota, dissipated on November 18.

Altogether, the season produced 31 tropical or subtropical cyclones, all but one of which became a named storm. Of the 30 named storms, 14 became hurricanes, and seven further intensified into major hurricanes. (Note: Hurricanes reaching Category 3 (111 miles per hour (179 km/h)) and higher on the 5-level Saffir–Simpson wind speed scale are considered major hurricanes.) It was the second and final season to use the Greek letter storm naming system, the first being 2005.

This timeline documents tropical cyclone formations, strengthening, weakening, landfalls, extratropical transitions, and dissipations during the season. It includes information that was not released throughout the season, meaning that data from post-storm reviews by the National Hurricane Center, such as a storm that was not initially warned upon, has been included.

The time stamp for each event is first stated using Coordinated Universal Time (UTC), the 24-hour clock where 00:00 = midnight UTC. The NHC uses both UTC and the time zone where the center of the tropical cyclone is currently located. The time zones utilized (east to west) are: Greenwich, Cape Verde, Atlantic, Eastern, and Central. In this timeline, the respective area time is included in parentheses. Additionally, figures for maximum sustained winds and position estimates are rounded to the nearest 5 units (miles, or kilometers), following National Hurricane Center practice. Direct wind observations are rounded to the nearest whole number. Atmospheric pressures are listed to the nearest millibar and nearest hundredth of an inch of mercury.

== Timeline ==
=== May ===
May 16

- 18:00 UTC (2:00 p.m. EDT) at 28.0°N 78.7°W – Tropical Depression One forms from a broad area of low pressure about 125 mi (201 km) east of Melbourne, Florida.

May 17

- 00:00 UTC (8:00 p.m. EDT May 16) at 28.9°N 78.0°W – Tropical Depression One intensifies into Tropical Storm Arthur approximately 190 mi (310 km) east-northeast of Cape Canaveral, Florida.

May 19

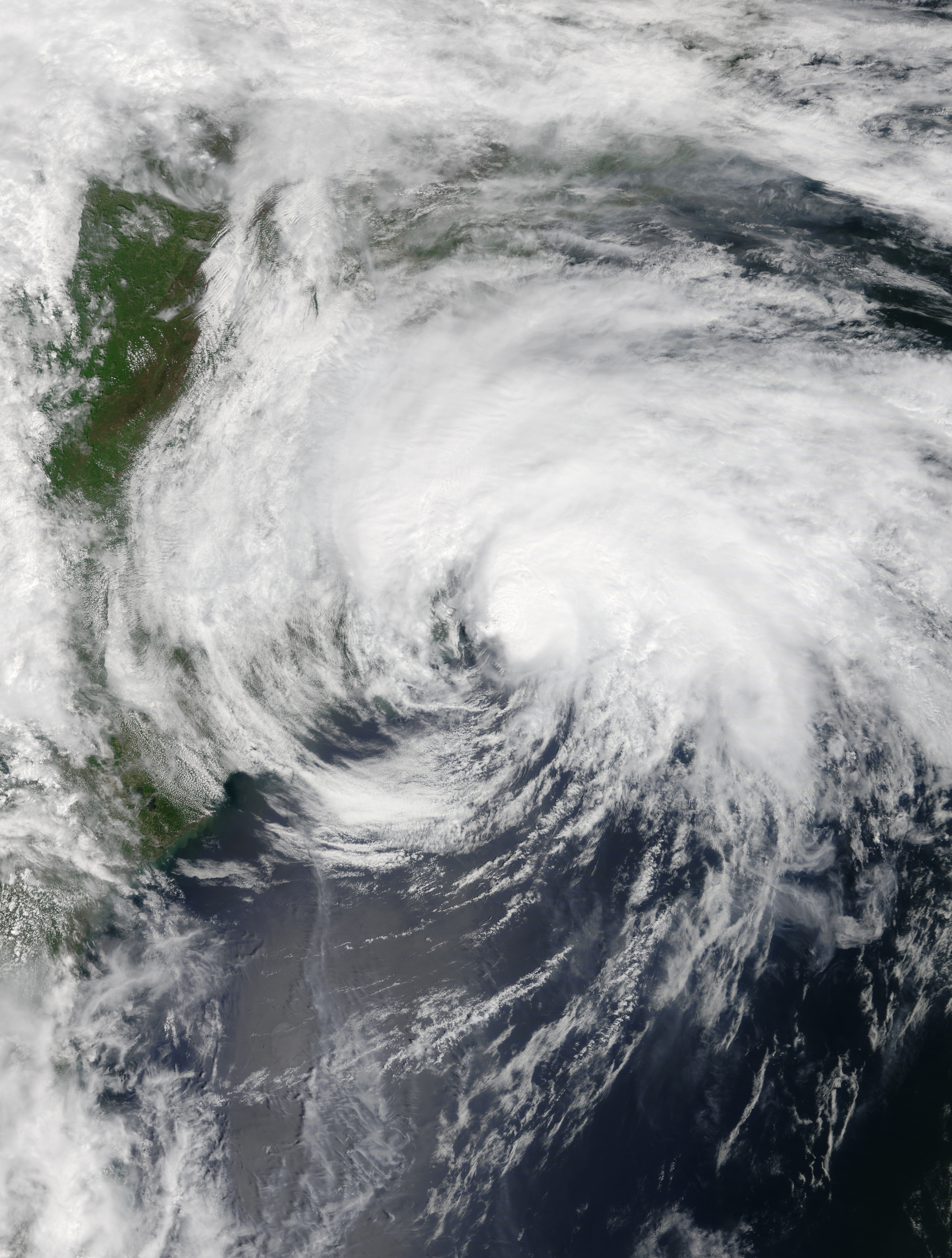
Tropical Storm Arthur off the North Carolina coast near peak intensity on May 18

- 06:00 UTC (2:00 a.m. EDT) at 36.8°N 71.4°W – Tropical Storm Arthur reaches its peak intensity with maximum sustained winds of 60 mph (97 km/h) and a minimum barometric pressure of 990 mbar (29 inHg), about 190 mi (310 km) east-northeast of Cape Hatteras, North Carolina.
- 12:00 UTC (8:00 a.m. AST) at 37.0°N 69.5°W – Tropical Storm Arthur transitions into an extratropical cyclone roughly 405 mi (652 km) east-northeast of Cape Hatteras, and subsequently dissipates.

May 27

- 06:00 UTC (2:00 a.m. EDT) at 31.5°N 78.8°W – Tropical Storm Bertha forms from a weak and elongated low about 110 mi (180 km) southeast of Charleston, South Carolina.
- 12:00 UTC (8:00 a.m. EDT) at 32.6°N 79.5°W – Tropical Storm Bertha reaches its peak intensity with maximum sustained winds of 50 mph (80 km/h) and a central pressure of 1,005 mbar (29.7 inHg), while located about 35 mi (56 km) east-southeast of Charleston.
- 13:30 UTC (9:30 a.m. EDT) at 32.9°N 79.7°W – Tropical Storm Bertha makes landfall near Isle of Palms, South Carolina, with winds of 50 mph (80 km/h).
- 18:00 UTC (2:00 p.m. EDT) at 33.7°N 80.1°W – Tropical Storm Bertha weakens to a tropical depression approximately 65 mi (105 km) north-northwest of Charleston.

May 28

- 06:00 UTC (2:00 a.m. EDT) at 37.1°N 81.1°W – Tropical Depression Bertha transitions to an extratropical cyclone about 70 mi (110 km) southwest of Roanoke, Virginia, and later dissipates.

=== June ===
June 1

- The 2020 Atlantic hurricane season officially begins.
- 18:00 UTC (1:00 p.m. CDT) at 19.4°N 90.9°W – Tropical Depression Three forms from the remnants of Tropical Storm Amanda about 40 mi (64 km) southwest of Campeche, Campeche.

June 2

- 12:00 UTC (7:00 a.m. CDT) at 19.5°N 92.5°W – Tropical Depression Three intensifies into Tropical Storm Cristobal (Note: According to the NHC's protocol, a tropical cyclone that degenerates into a remnant low in one basin and regenerates in another is given a different name. Since Amanda, a Pacific tropical storm, degenerated over Central America, the regenerated Atlantic tropical cyclone was given the next name on the Atlantic list, Cristobal.) while centered about 75 mi (121 km) northwest of Ciudad del Carmen, Campeche.

June 3

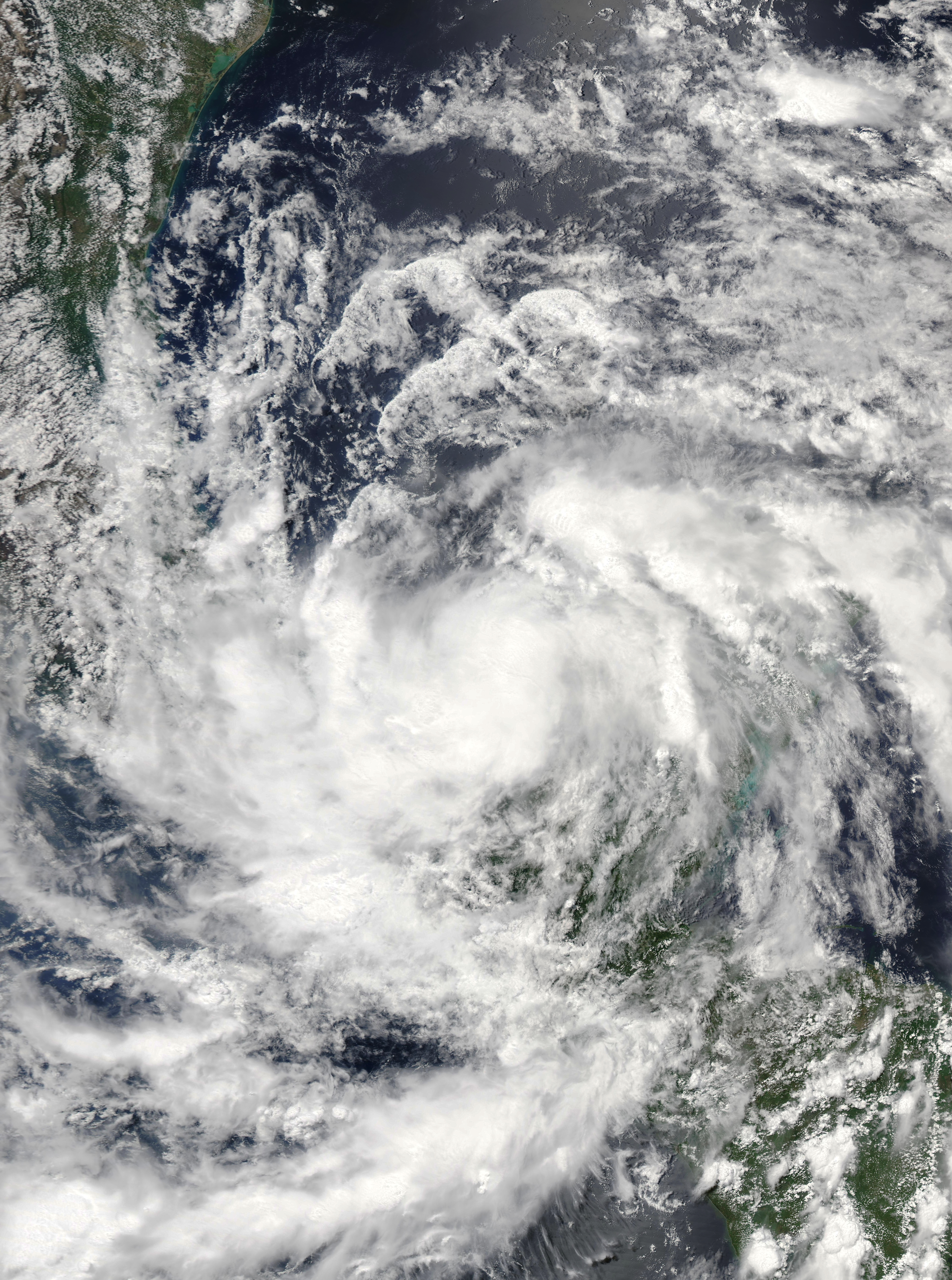
Tropical Storm Cristobal shortly after landfall in Campeche on June 3

- 06:00 UTC (1:00 a.m CDT) at 18.9°N 92.3°W – Tropical Storm Cristobal attains maximum sustained winds of 60 mph (97 km/h), while located about 40 mi (64 km) northwest of Ciudad del Carmen.
- 13:00 UTC (8:00 a.m. CDT) at 18.7°N 92.1°W – Tropical Storm Cristobal makes its first landfall near Atasta, Campeche, about 35 mi (56 km) west of Ciudad del Carmen, with sustained winds of 60 mph (97 km/h) and a central barometric pressure of 993 mbar (29.3 inHg).

June 4

- 12:00 UTC (7:00 a.m. CDT) at 17.7°N 91.2°W – Tropical Storm Cristobal weakens to a tropical depression about 70 mi (110 km) southeast of Ciudad del Carmen, near the Guatemala–Mexico border.

June 5

- 06:00 UTC (1:00 a.m. CDT) at 18.6°N 90.1°W – Tropical Depression Cristobal re-strengthens to a tropical storm about 90 mi (140 km) south-southeast of Campeche.

June 6

- 00:00 UTC (7:00 p.m. CDT June 5) at 22.0°N 90.0°W – Tropical Storm Cristobal attains maximum sustained winds of 60 mph (97 km/h), while centered about 50 mi (80 km) north-northwest of Progreso, Yucatán.

June 7

- 22:00 UTC (5:00 p.m. CDT) at 29.3°N 89.8°W – Tropical Storm Cristobal makes its second landfall about 10 mi (16 km) east of Grand Isle, Louisiana, with winds of 50 mph (80 km/h) and a central pressure of 990 mbar (29 inHg).

June 8

- 12:00 UTC (7:00 a.m. CDT) at 31.7°N 91.5°W – Tropical Storm Cristobal weakens to a tropical depression about 10 mi (16 km) west-northwest of Natchez, Mississippi.

June 9

- 18:00 UTC (1:00 p.m. CDT) at 40.3°N 91.7°W – Tropical Depression Cristobal reaches its minimum pressure of 988 mbar (29.2 inHg), while located about 145 mi (233 km) north-northwest of St. Louis, Missouri.

June 10

- 00:00 UTC (7:00 p.m. CDT, June 9) at 42.6°N 90.8°W – Tropical Depression Cristobal becomes an extratropical low while centered about 15 mi (24 km) north-northwest of Dubuque, Iowa, and subsequently dissipates.

June 22

- 12:00 UTC (8:00 a.m. AST) at 38.4°N 66.9°W – Subtropical Depression Four forms from a broad non-tropical surface low-pressure area about 405 mi (652 km) east-southeast of Cape Cod, Massachusetts.

June 23

- 06:00 UTC (2:00 a.m. AST) at 39.0°N 63.9°W – Subtropical Depression Four intensifies into Subtropical Storm Dolly about 405 mi (652 km) south of Halifax, Nova Scotia.
- 12:00 UTC (8:00 a.m. AST) at 39.4°N 62.7°W – Subtropical Storm Dolly transitions into a tropical storm and simultaneously reaches its peak intensity with 45 mph (72 km/h) maximum sustained winds and minimum barometric pressure of 1,000 mbar (30 inHg), while located about 370 mi (600 km) south-southeast of Halifax.

June 24

- 06:00 UTC (2:00 a.m. AST) at 41.0°N 59.6°W – Tropical Storm Dolly degenerates into a remnant low about 340 mi (550 km) southeast of Halifax, and subsequently opens up into a surface trough.

=== July ===
July 4

- 12:00 UTC (8:00 a.m. AST) at 30.9°N 69.4°W – Tropical Depression Five forms from a non-tropical low-pressure area while centered about 290 mi (470 km) west-southwest of Bermuda.

July 6

- 00:00 UTC (8:00 p.m. AST, July 5) at 36.4°N 58.5°W – Tropical Depression Five strengthens into Tropical Storm Edouard, about 455 nmi (843 km) northeast of Bermuda.
- 18:00 UTC (2:00 p.m. AST) at 41.7°N 47.8°W – Tropical Storm Edouard reaches its peak intensity with maximum sustained winds of 45 mph (72 km/h) and a minimum barometric pressure of 1,005 mbar (29.7 inHg), about 430 mi (690 km) southeast of Cape Race, Newfoundland.

July 7

- 00:00 UTC (8:00 p.m. AST, July 6) at 43.6°N 44.1°W – Tropical Storm Edouard becomes extratropical about 490 mi (790 km) east-southeast of Cape Race Newfoundland, and subsequently dissipates.

July 9

- 18:00 UTC (2:00 p.m. EDT) at 35.4°N 74.9°W – Tropical Storm Fay develops from a complex of thunderstorms associated with a low-pressure area about 40 mi (64 km) east-northeast of Cape Hatteras, North Carolina.

July 10

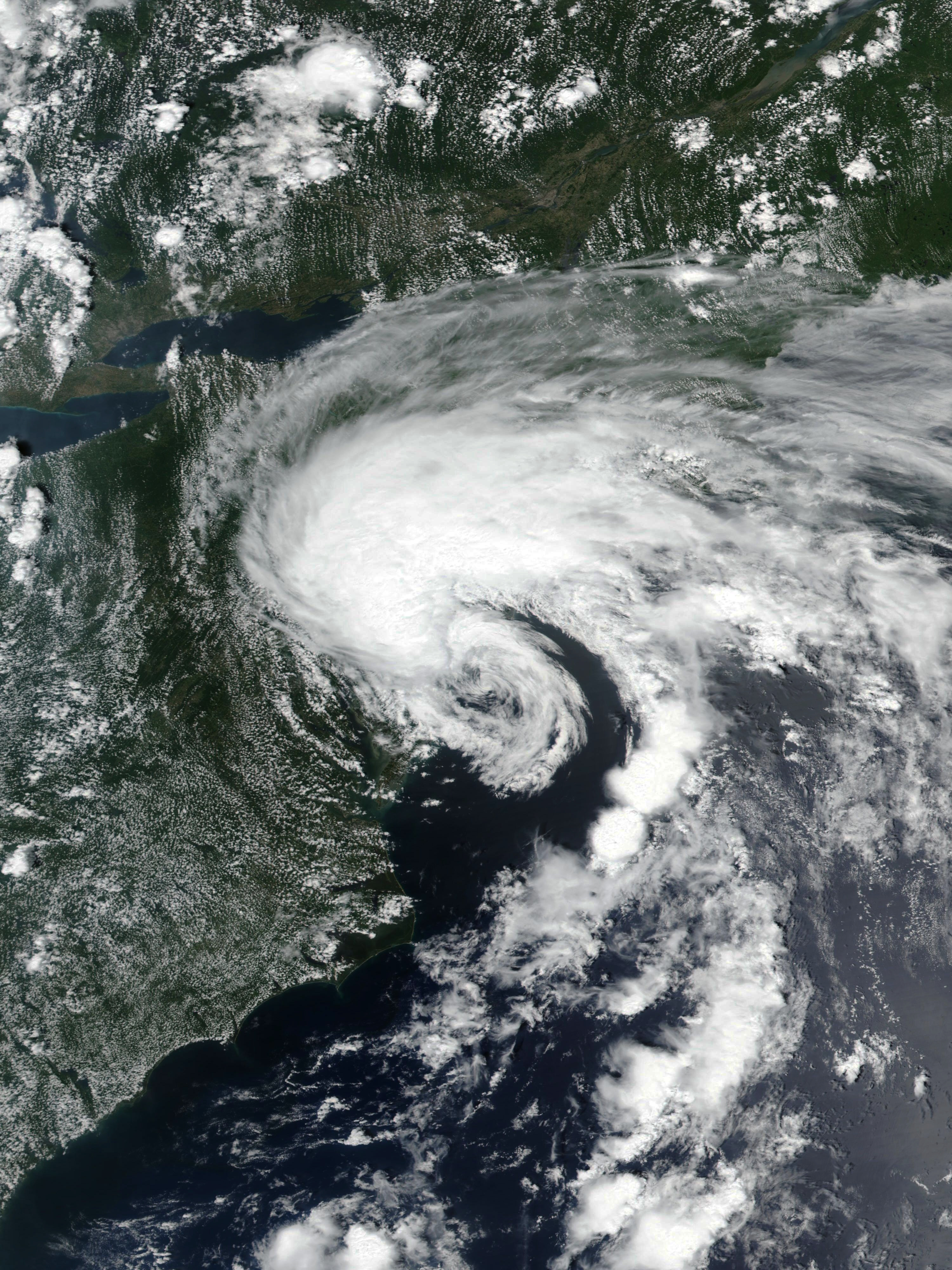
Tropical Storm Fay at peak intensity shortly before landfall in New Jersey on July 10

- 18:00 UTC (2:00 p.m. EDT) at 38.9°N 74.4°W – Tropical Storm Fay reaches its peak intensity with maximum sustained winds of 60 mph (97 km/h) and a minimum barometric pressure of 998 mbar (29.5 inHg), about 25 mi (40 km) east-southeast of Cape May, New Jersey.
- 20:00 UTC (4:00 p.m. EDT) at 39.4°N 74.4°W – Tropical Storm Fay makes landfall about 10 mi (16 km) north-northeast of Atlantic City, New Jersey, with maximum sustained winds of 50 mph (80 km/h).

July 11

- 06:00 UTC (2:00 a.m. EDT) at 41.5°N 74.2°W – Tropical Storm Fay weakens to a remnant low inland, about 50 mi (80 km) north of New York, New York, and is later absorbed into a larger mid-latitude low.

July 21

- 18:00 UTC (2:00 p.m. AST) at 9.7°N 40.0°W – Tropical Depression Seven forms from a broad low pressure system moving slowly westward within the Intertropical Convergence Zone, about 1,440 mi (2,320 km) east of the southern Windward Islands.

July 22

- 06:00 UTC (2:00 a.m. AST) at 9.8°N 41.9°W – Tropical Depression Seven intensifies into Tropical Storm Gonzalo, about 1,320 mi (2,120 km) east of the southern Windward Islands.

July 23

- 00:00 UTC (7:00 p.m. CDT, July 22) at 25.7°N 88.3°W – Tropical Depression Eight forms from a tropical wave over the central Gulf of Mexico, about 240 mi (390 km) south-southeast of the mouth of the Mississippi River.
- 06:00 UTC (2:00 a.m. AST) at 9.7°N 46.6°W – Tropical Storm Gonzalo reaches its peak intensity of 65 mph (105 km/h) maximum sustained winds and minimum barometric pressure of 997 mbar (hPa; 29.44 inHg), while located about 690 mi (1,110 km) east of the southern Windward Islands.

July 24

- 00:00 UTC (7:00 p.m. CDT, July 23) at 26.2°N 91.1°W – Tropical Depression Eight strengthens into Tropical Storm Hanna about 230 mi (370 km) south-southwest of the mouth of the Mississippi River.

July 25

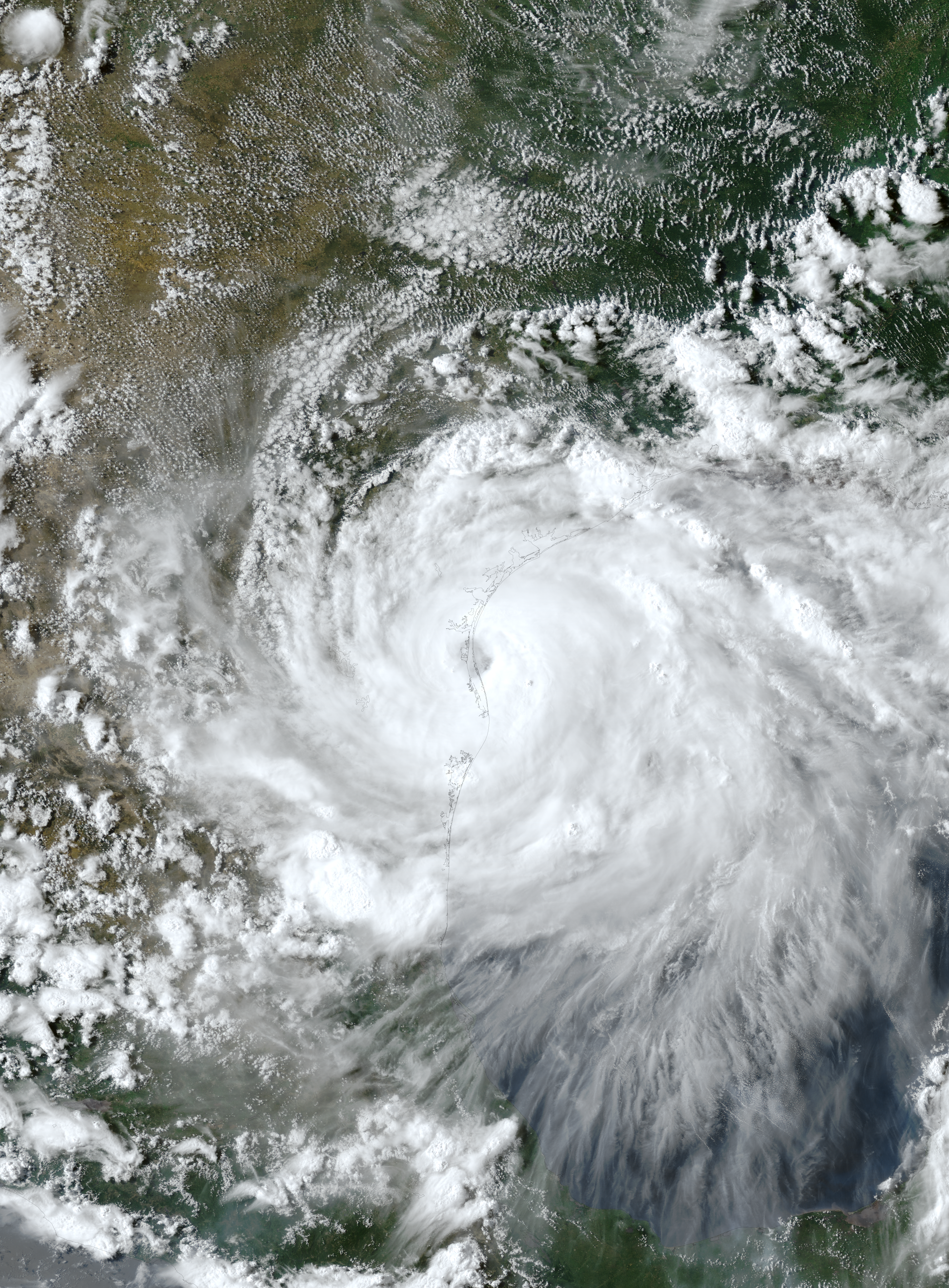
Hurricane Hanna at peak intensity making landfall in Texas on July 25

- 12:00 UTC (7:00 a.m. CDT) at 27.1°N 96.0°W – Tropical Storm Hanna intensifies into a Category 1 hurricane about 90 mi (140 km) east-northeast of Port Mansfield, Texas.
- 15:30 UTC (11:30 a.m. AST) at 10.5°N 61.0°W – Tropical Storm Gonzalo weakens to a tropical depression just before making landfall along the eastern coast of Trinidad, near Manzanilla Beach, and later degenerates into an open trough.
- 18:00 UTC (1:00 p.m. CDT) at 26.9°N 96.8°W – Hurricane Hanna attains its peak intensity with maximum sustained winds of 90 mph (140 km/h) and minimum barometric pressure of 973 mbar (28.7 inHg), just off the coast of South Texas.
- 22:00 UTC (5:00 p.m. CDT) at 26.8°N 97.3°W – Hurricane Hanna makes landfall on Padre Island, Texas, with maximum sustained winds of 90 mph (140 km/h).
- 23:15 UTC (6:15 p.m. CDT) at 26.7°N 97.5°W – Hurricane Hanna makes a second landfall about 10 mi (16 km) north-northwest of Port Mansfield, with maximum sustained winds of 90 mph (140 km/h).

July 26

- 06:00 UTC (1:00 a.m. CDT) at 26.5°N 98.5°W – Hurricane Hanna weakens to a tropical storm about 70 mi (110 km) west-southwest of Port Mansfield, Texas.
- 18:00 UTC (1:00 p.m. CDT) at 25.8°N 100.3°W – Tropical Storm Hanna weakens to a tropical depression about 10 mi (16 km) north of Monterrey, Nuevo León, and dissipates shortly thereafter.

July 30

- 00:00 UTC (8:00 p.m. AST, July 29) at 15.8°N 65.7°W – Tropical Storm Isaias forms from a tropical wave about 140 mi (230 km) south of Ponce, Puerto Rico. (Note: Due to the threat the system posed as it formed to the countries and territories in the eastern Caribbean, the National Hurricane Center initiated advisories on the system as Potential Tropical Cyclone Nine at 15:00 UTC (11:00 a.m. AST) on July 28.)
- 16:15 UTC (12:15 p.m. AST) at 18.4°N 69.3°W – Tropical Storm Isaias makes landfall near San Pedro de Macorís, Dominican Republic with sustained winds of 65 mph (105 km/h).

July 31

- 00:00 UTC (8:00 p.m. AST, July 30) at 19.9°N 71.2°W – Tropical Storm Isaias strengthens into a Category 1 hurricane after emerging offshore of the northern coast of Hispaniola, about 45 mi (72 km) north-northwest of Puerto Plata, Dominican Republic.
- 09:00 UTC (5:00 a.m. EDT) at 20.9°N 73.4°W – Hurricane Isaias makes landfall on Great Inagua Island, Bahamas, with sustained winds of 80 mph (130 km/h).
- 18:00 UTC (8:00 p.m. CVT) at 15.5°N 19.7°W – Tropical Depression Ten forms from a tropical wave about 230 mi (370 km) east of the easternmost Cabo Verde Islands.

=== August ===
August 1

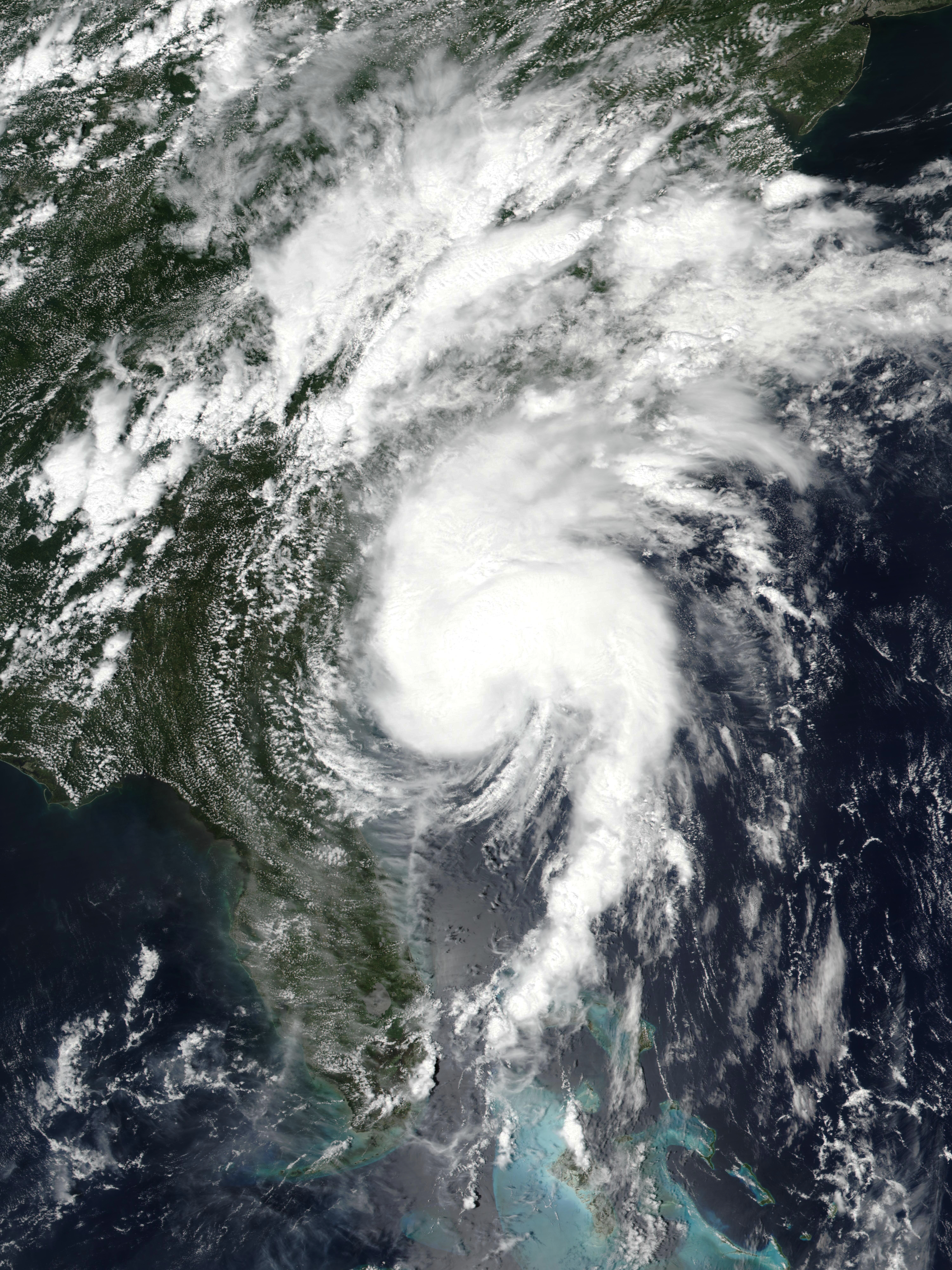
Hurricane Isaias intensifying near the Carolinas on August 3

- 13:00 UTC (9:00 a.m. EDT) at 24.4°N 77.7°W – Hurricane Isaias makes landfall on Andros Island, Bahamas, with sustained winds of 80 mph (130 km/h).
- 18:00 UTC (2:00 p.m. EDT) at 24.8°N 79.3°W – Hurricane Isaias weakens to a tropical storm about 115 mi (185 km) south of Freeport, Bahamas.

August 2

- 00:00 UTC (11:00 p.m. CVT, August 1) at 19.5°N 25.0°W – Tropical Depression Ten degenerates to a remnant low while located about 230 mi (370 km) north of the Cabo Verde Islands, and later dissipates.

August 3

- 18:00 UTC (2:00 p.m. EDT) at 31.2°N 79.7°W – Tropical Storm Isaias regains hurricane strength about 115 mi (185 km) south of Charleston, South Carolina.

August 4

- 00:00 UTC (8:00 p.m. EDT, August 3) at 32.8°N 79.1°W – Hurricane Isaias reaches its peak intensity with maximum sustained winds of 90 mph (140 km/h) and a minimum barometric pressure of 986 mbar (29.1 inHg), while located about 60 mi (97 km) east of Charleston, South Carolina.
- 03:10 UTC (11:10 p.m. EDT, August 3) at 33.9°N 78.5°W – Hurricane Isaias makes its fourth and final landfall near Ocean Isle Beach, North Carolina, with maximum sustained winds of 90 mph (140 km/h).
- 06:00 UTC (2:00 a.m. EDT) at 35.0°N 78.1°W – Hurricane Isaias weakens inland to a tropical storm about 60 mi (97 km) southwest of Greenville, North Carolina.

August 5

- 00:00 UTC (8:00 p.m. EDT, August 4) at 44.0°N 73.1°W – Tropical Storm Isaias transitions to an extratropical low while located about 5 mi (8.0 km) north-northwest of Rutland, Vermont, and later dissipates.

August 11

- 06:00 UTC (2:00 a.m. AST) at 11.4°N 36.8°W – Tropical Depression Eleven forms from a tropical wave about 920 mi (1,480 km) west-southwest of the Cabo Verde Islands.

August 13

- 12:00 UTC (8:00 a.m. AST) at 13.4°N 48.6°W – Tropical Depression Eleven becomes Tropical Storm Josephine roughly 1,035 mi (1,666 km) east-southeast of the northern Leeward Islands.

August 14

- 12:00 UTC (8:00 a.m. EDT) at 36.6°N 74.2°W – Tropical Storm Kyle develops from a mesoscale convective system about 105 mi (169 km) east-northeast of Duck, North Carolina.
- 18:00 UTC (2:00 p.m. AST) at 17.4°N 55.6°W – Tropical Storm Josephine attains its peak intensity with maximum sustained winds of 45 mph (72 km/h) and a minimum pressure at 1,004 mbar (29.6 inHg), while located about 460 mi (740 km) east of the northern Leeward Islands.

August 15

- 12:00 UTC (2:00 a.m. AST) at 38.8°N 66.7°W – Tropical Storm Kyle attains its peak intensity with maximum sustained winds of 50 mph (80 km/h) and a minimum pressure at 1,000 mbar (30 inHg), about 230 mi (370 km) southeast of Cape Cod, Massachusetts.

August 16

- 00:00 UTC (8:00 p.m.AST, August 15) at 39.7°N 61.6°W – Tropical Storm Kyle becomes extratropical roughly 545 mi (877 km) southwest of Cape Race, Newfoundland, and is absorbed by a nearby stationary front.
- 06:00 UTC (2:00 a.m. AST) at 20.0°N 63.4°W – Tropical Storm Josephine weakens to a tropical depression roughly 105 mi (169 km) north of the northern Leeward Islands, and later dissipates.

August 20

- 00:00 UTC 14.4°N 47.3°W – Tropical Depression Thirteen forms from a tropical wave about 980 mi (1,580 km) east-southeast of Antigua.

August 21

- 06:00 UTC (2:00 a.m. EDT) at 15.3°N 82.9°W – Tropical Depression Fourteen forms from a tropical wave about 30 mi (48 km) northeast of Cabo Gracias a Dios on the Honduras–Nicaragua border.
- 12:00 UTC (8:00 a.m. AST) at 17.0°N 59.4°W – Tropical Depression Thirteen strengthens into Tropical Storm Laura, about 255 mi (410 km) east of the northern Leeward Islands.
- 20:30 UTC (4:30 p.m. AST) at 17.1°N 61.8°W – Tropical Storm Laura makes landfall on Antigua with sustained winds of 45 mph (72 km/h).
- 23:30 UTC (7:30 p.m. AST) at 17.1°N 62.6°W – Tropical Storm Laura makes landfall on Nevis with sustained winds of 45 mph (72 km/h).

August 22

- 00:00 UTC (8:00 p.m. EDT, August 21) at 18.3°N 84.6°W – Tropical Depression Fourteen intensifies and becomes Tropical Storm Marco about 210 mi (340 km) southeast of Cozumel, Quintana Roo.

August 23

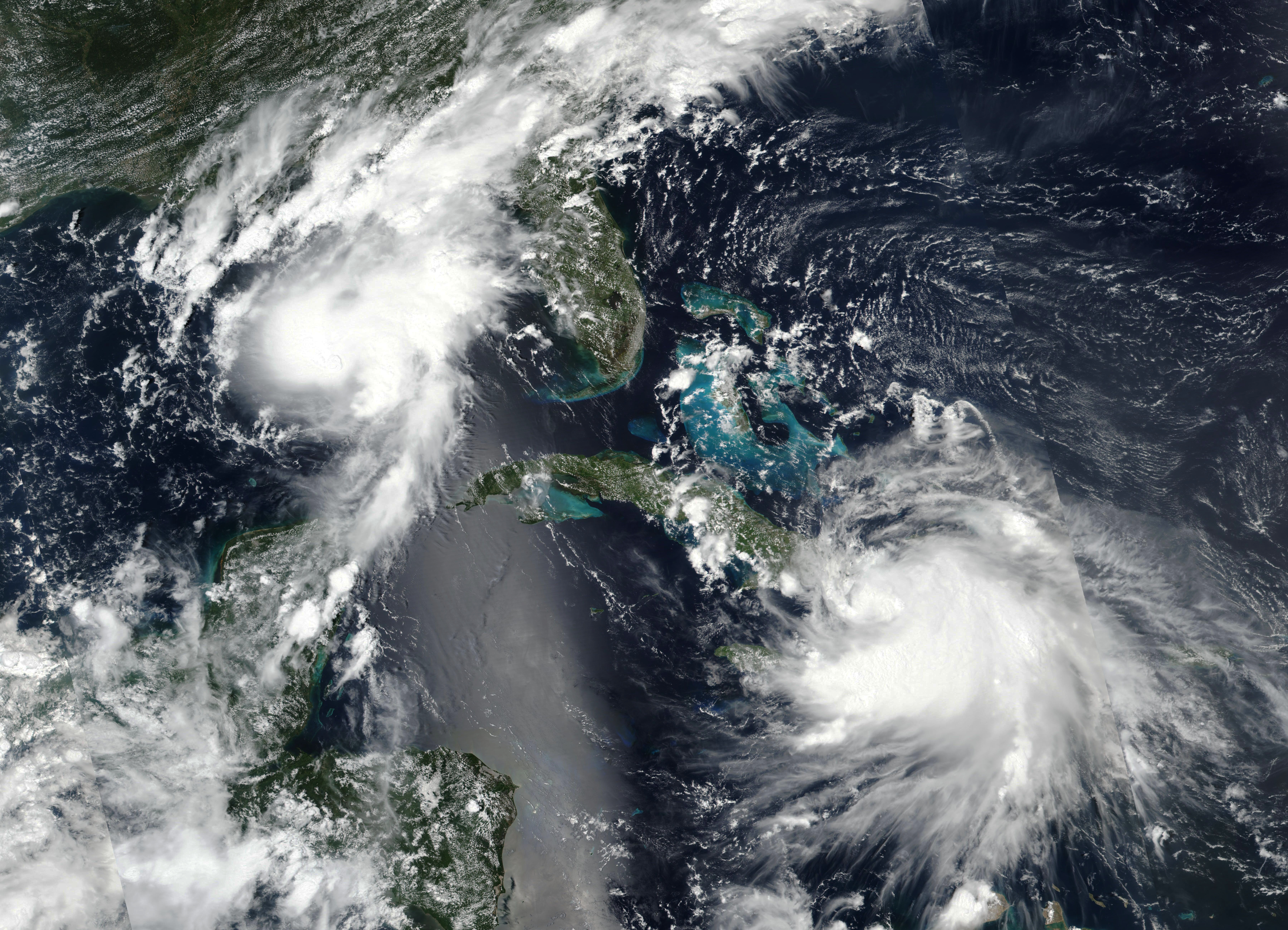
Marco over the Gulf of Mexico and Laura over Hispaniola on August 23

- 04:30 UTC (12:30 a.m. AST) at 18.4°N 70.0°W – Tropical Storm Laura makes landfall about 25 mi (40 km) west of Santo Domingo, Dominican Republic, with sustained winds of 50 mph (80 km/h).
- 12:00 UTC (7:00 a.m. CDT) at 24.3°N 87.2°W – Tropical Storm Marco strengthens to a Category 1 hurricane about 210 mi (340 km) northwest of the western tip of Cuba, and simultaneously reaches its peak intensity with maximum sustained winds of 75 mph (120 km/h) and minimum pressure of 991 mbar (29.3 inHg).

August 24

- 00:00 UTC (7:00 p.m. CDT, August 23) at 26.4°N 87.6°W – Hurricane Marco weakens to a tropical storm about 265 mi (425 km) south-southeast of the mouth of the Mississippi River.
- 02:00 UTC (10:00 p.m. EDT, August 23) at 20.0°N 76.6°W – Tropical Storm Laura makes landfall near Uvero, Santiago de Cuba Province, with sustained winds of 65 mph (105 km/h).

August 25

- 00:00 UTC (8:00 p.m. EDT, August 24) at 22.3°N 83.3°W – Tropical Storm Laura makes landfall near Playa de las Tunas, Pinar del Río Province, with sustained winds of 65 mph (105 km/h).
- 00:00 UTC (7:00 p.m. CDT, August 24) at 28.9°N 89.3°W – Tropical Storm Marco passes about 10 mi (16 km) south of the mouth of the Mississippi River, and weakens to a tropical depression shortly thereafter.
- 06:00 UTC (1:00 a.m. CDT) at 28.7°N 90.5°W – Tropical Depression Marco degenerates into a remnant low about 80 mi (130 km) west-southwest of the mouth of the Mississippi River, and later opens up into a trough.
- 12:00 UTC (8:00 a.m. EDT) at 23.4°N 86.2°W – Tropical Storm Laura strengthens to a Category 1 hurricane about 430 mi (690 km) south-southeast of the mouth of the Mississippi River.

August 26

- 06:00 UTC (1:00 a.m. CDT) at 25.6°N 90.2°W – Hurricane Laura intensifies to Category 2 strength about 360 mi (580 km) south-southeast of Lake Charles, Louisiana.
- 12:00 UTC (7:00 a.m. CDT) at 26.4°N 91.4°W – Hurricane Laura intensifies to Category 3 strength about 280 mi (455 km) south-southeast of Lake Charles.
- 18:00 UTC (1:00 p.m. CDT) at 27.3°N 92.5°W – Hurricane Laura intensifies to Category 4 strength about 200 mi (325 km) south-southeast of Lake Charles.

August 27

- 00:00 UTC (7:00 p.m. CDT, August 26) at 28.5°N 93.0°W – Hurricane Laura reaches its peak intensity with maximum sustained winds of 150 mph (240 km/h) and minimum pressure 937 mbar (27.7 inHg), about 120 mi (190 km) south of Lake Charles.
- 06:00 UTC (1:00 a.m. CDT) at 29.8°N 93.3°W – Hurricane Laura makes landfall near Cameron, Louisiana, with sustained winds of 150 mph (240 km/h).
- 09:00 UTC (4:00 a.m. CDT) at 30.5°N 93.4°W – Hurricane Laura weakens to Category 3 strength inland about 30 mi (48 km) north-northwest of Lake Charles.
- 10:00 UTC (5:00 a.m. CDT) at 30.7°N 93.4°W – Hurricane Laura weakens to Category 2 strength about 45 mi (72 km) north-northwest of Lake Charles.
- 14:00 UTC (9:00 a.m. CDT) at 31.7°N 93.1°W – Hurricane Laura weakens to Category 1 strength about 65 mi (105 km) south-southeast of Shreveport, Louisiana.
- 17:00 UTC (12:00 p.m. CDT) at 32.6°N 92.9°W – Hurricane Laura weakens to tropical storm strength about 50 mi (80 km) east-southeast of Shreveport.

August 28

- 06:00 UTC (1:00 a.m. CDT) at 35.4°N 92.0°W – Tropical Storm Laura weakens to a tropical depression about 50 mi (80 km) north-northeast of Little Rock, Arkansas.

August 29

- 06:00 UTC (2:00 a.m. EDT) at 38.3°N 84.8°W – Tropical Depression Laura degenerates into a remnant low about 55 mi (89 km) east of Louisville, Kentucky, and is later absorbed by another low.

August 31

- 12:00 UTC (8:00 a.m. EDT) at 31.5°N 77.4°W – Tropical Depression Fifteen develops from a non-tropical low about 150 mi (240 km) south-southeast of Wilmington, North Carolina.

=== September ===
September 1

- 06:00 UTC (2:00 a.m. AST) at 15.9°N 75.2°W – Tropical Storm Nana develops rapidly from a tropical wave about 180 mi (290 km) southeast of Kingston, Jamaica. (Note: At the time, the National Hurricane Center did not name the system at that point because it was unclear whether it had a well-defined low-level-circulation. However, with the storm posing an imminent threat to Central America, the National Hurricane Center initiated advisories on the system as Potential Tropical Cyclone Sixteen that day at 15:00 UTC (10:00 a.m. CDT).)
- 12:00 UTC (8:00 a.m. EDT) at 34.6°N 73.7°W – Tropical Depression Fifteen strengthens into Tropical Storm Omar about 115 mi (185 km) southeast of Cape Hatteras, North Carolina, and simultaneously reaches its peak intensity with sustained winds of 40 mph (64 km/h) and a minimum pressure of 1,003 mbar (29.6 inHg).

September 3

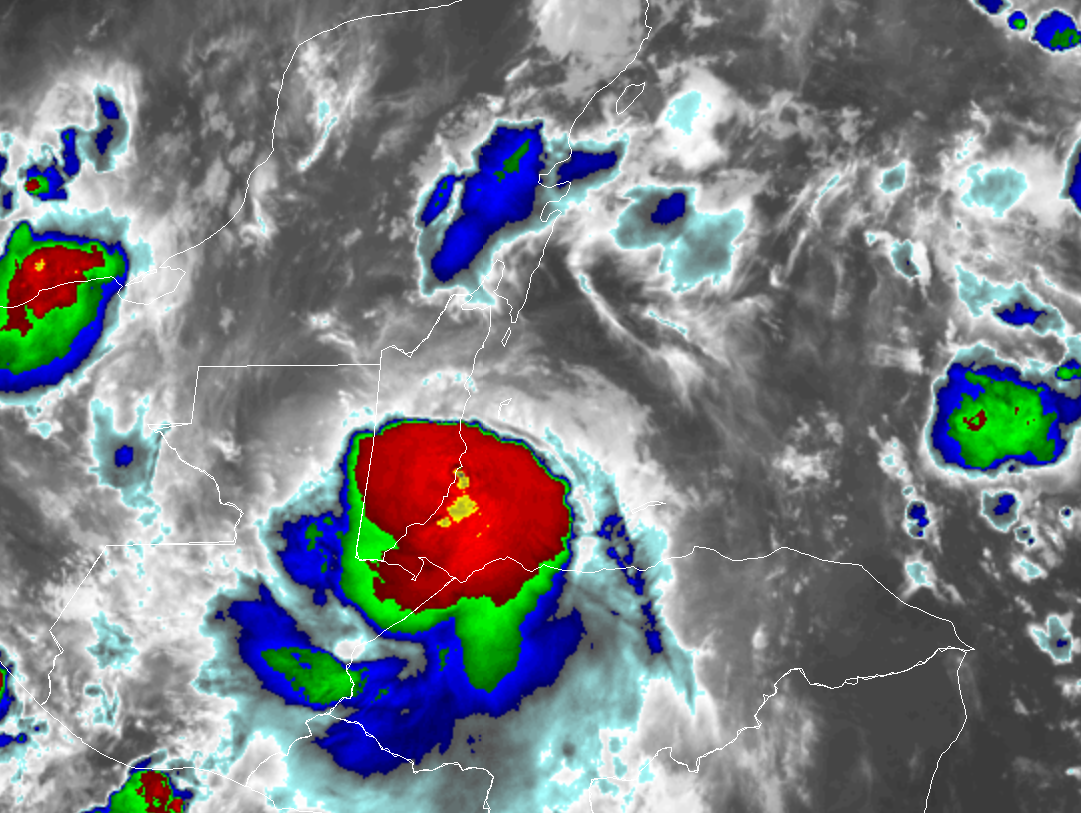
Infrared imagery of Hurricane Nana at peak intensity while making landfall in Belize on September 3

- 00:00 UTC (8:00 p.m. AST, September 2) at 36.2°N 64.8°W – Tropical Storm Omar weakens to a tropical depression about 265 mi (425 km) north of Bermuda.
- 03:00 UTC (10:00 p.m. CDT, September 2) at 16.9°N 87.5°W – Tropical Storm Nana becomes a Category 1 hurricane about 60 mi (97 km) southeast of Belize City, Belize, and simultaneously reaches its peak intensity with sustained winds of 75 mph (121 km/h) and a minimum central pressure of 994 mbar (29.4 inHg).
- 06:00 UTC (1:00 a.m. CDT) at 16.8°N 88.3°W – Hurricane Nana makes landfall with estimated maximum winds of 75 mph (120 km/h) near Sittee Point, about 50 mi (80 km) south of Belize City.
- 12:00 UTC (7:00 a.m. CDT) at 16.4°N 89.6°W – Hurricane Nana weakens to a tropical storm about 120 mi (190 km) southwest of Belize City.
- 18:00 UTC (1:00 p.m. CDT) at 16.1°N 90.5°W – Tropical Storm Nana weakens to a tropical depression about 120 mi (190 km) north of Guatemala City, Guatemala.

September 4

- 00:00 UTC (7:00 p.m., September 3) at 15.8°N 91.4°W – Tropical Depression Nana degenerates into a remnant low about 105 mi (169 km) northwest of Guatemala City, and dissipates shortly thereafter. (Note: The remnants of Nana emerged over the Gulf of Tehuantepec on September 4 and were responsible for the formation of Tropical Storm Julio.)

September 5

- 18:00 UTC (2:00 p.m. AST) at 37.7°N 57.1°W – Tropical Depression Omar degenerates into a remnant low about 575 mi (925 km) northeast of Bermuda, and is later absorbed by a frontal system.

September 7

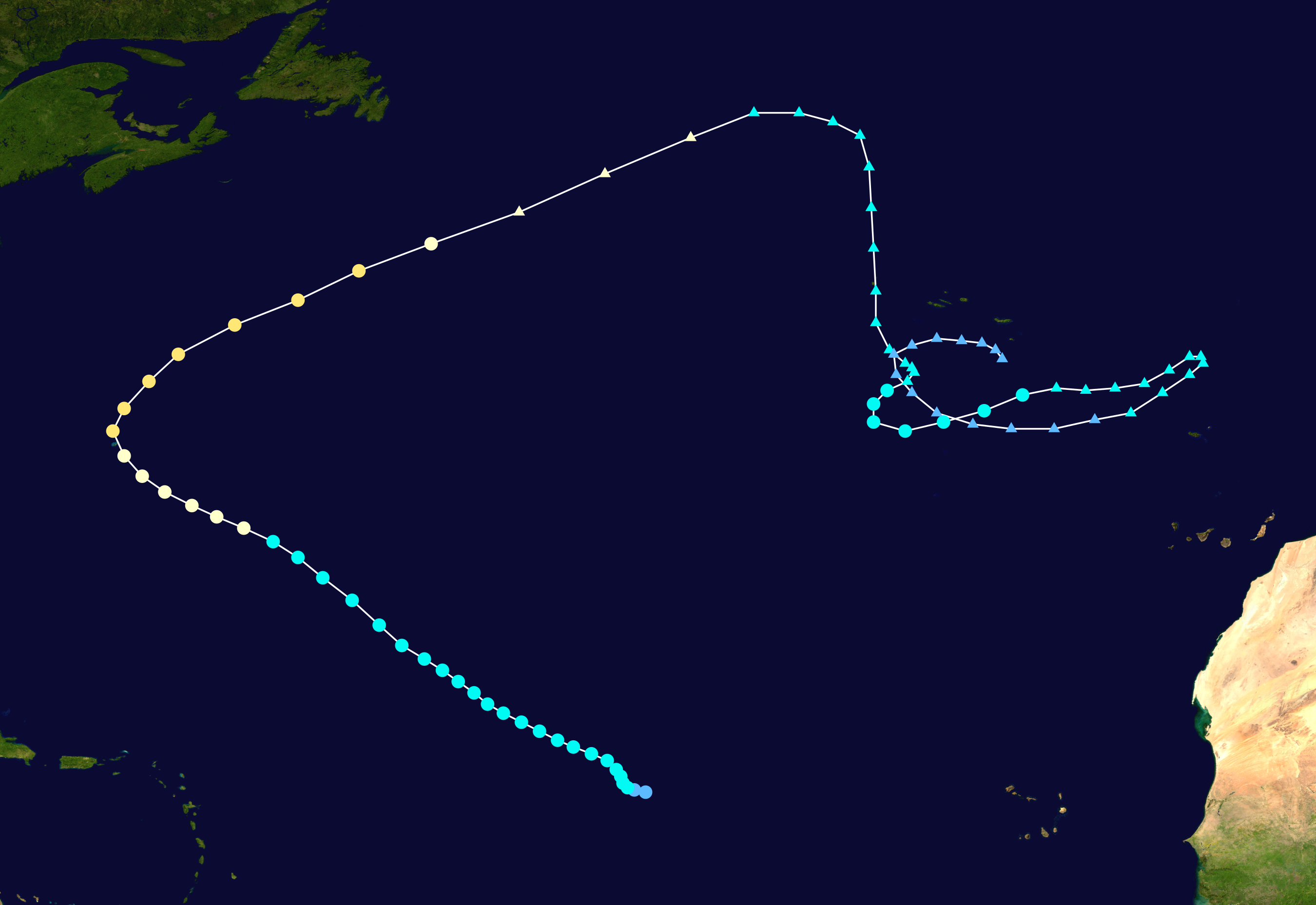
Map plotting the track and the intensity of Paulette, the season's longest-lived storm

- 00:00 UTC (8:00 p.m. AST, September 6) at 16.9°N 41.3°W – Tropical Depression Seventeen forms from a tropical wave about 1,150 mi (1,850 km) west of the Cabo Verde Islands.
- 06:00 UTC (5:00 a.m. CVT) at 15.2°N 19.8°W – Tropical Depression Eighteen develops from a tropical wave approximately 200 mi (320 km) east of the easternmost Cabo Verde Islands.
- 12:00 UTC (8:00 a.m. AST) at 17.1°N 42.1°W – Tropical Depression Seventeen becomes Tropical Storm Paulette about 1,380 mi (2,220 km) east of the northern Leeward Islands.
- 18:00 UTC (5:00 p.m. CVT) at 15.9°N 21.8°W – Tropical Depression Eighteen becomes Tropical Storm Rene about 105 mi (169 km) east-southeast of Sal Island.

September 8

- 18:00 UTC (5:00 p.m. CVT) at 16.6°N 27.1°W – Tropical Storm Rene weakens back to a tropical depression about 90 mi (140 km) west of Santo Antao Island.

September 9

- 12:00 UTC (8:00 a.m. AST) at 17.3°N 31.2°W – Tropical Depression Rene re-strengthens to a tropical storm about 405 mi (652 km) west of the northwestern Cabo Verde Islands.

September 10

- 12:00 UTC (8:00 a.m. AST) at 18.4°N 35.3°W – Tropical Storm Rene attains its peak sustained wind speed of 45 mph (72 km/h) while located about 670 mi (1,080 km) west-northwest of the northwestern Cabo Verde Islands.

September 11

- 18:00 UTC (2:00 p.m. EDT) at 25.4°N 78.6°W – Tropical Depression Nineteen forms from an area of disturbed weather between Andros Island and Bimini in the Bahamas, roughly 115 mi (185 km) east-southeast of Miami, Florida.

September 12

- 06:00 UTC (2:00 a.m. EDT) at 25.6°N 80.2°W – Tropical Depression Nineteen makes landfall about 10 mi (16 km) east of Cutler Bay, Florida, with winds of 35 mph (56 km/h).
- 06:00 UTC (2:00 a.m. AST) at11.0°N 31.4°W – Tropical Depression Twenty forms from a strong tropical wave about 575 mi (925 km) southwest of the Cabo Verde Islands.
- 12:00 UTC (8:00 a.m. AST) at 22.8°N 44.0°W – Tropical Storm Rene weakens to a tropical depression about 1,150 mi (1,850 km) east-northeast of the northern Leeward Islands.
- 12:00 UTC (8:00 a.m. EDT) at 25.5°N 80.8°W – Tropical Depression Nineteen becomes Tropical Storm Sally while the center was located over the Everglades about 100 mi (160 km) west of Homestead, Florida.
- 15:00 UTC (11:00 a.m.) at 25.6°N 81.5°W – Tropical Storm Sally emerges over the Gulf of Mexico, about 40 mi (64 km) south-southeast of Naples, Florida.

September 13

- 00:00 UTC (8:00 p.m. AST) September 12) at 28.6°N 59.1°W – Tropical Storm Paulette strengthens into a Category 1 hurricane about 415 mi (670 km) southeast of Tucker's Town, Bermuda.

September 14

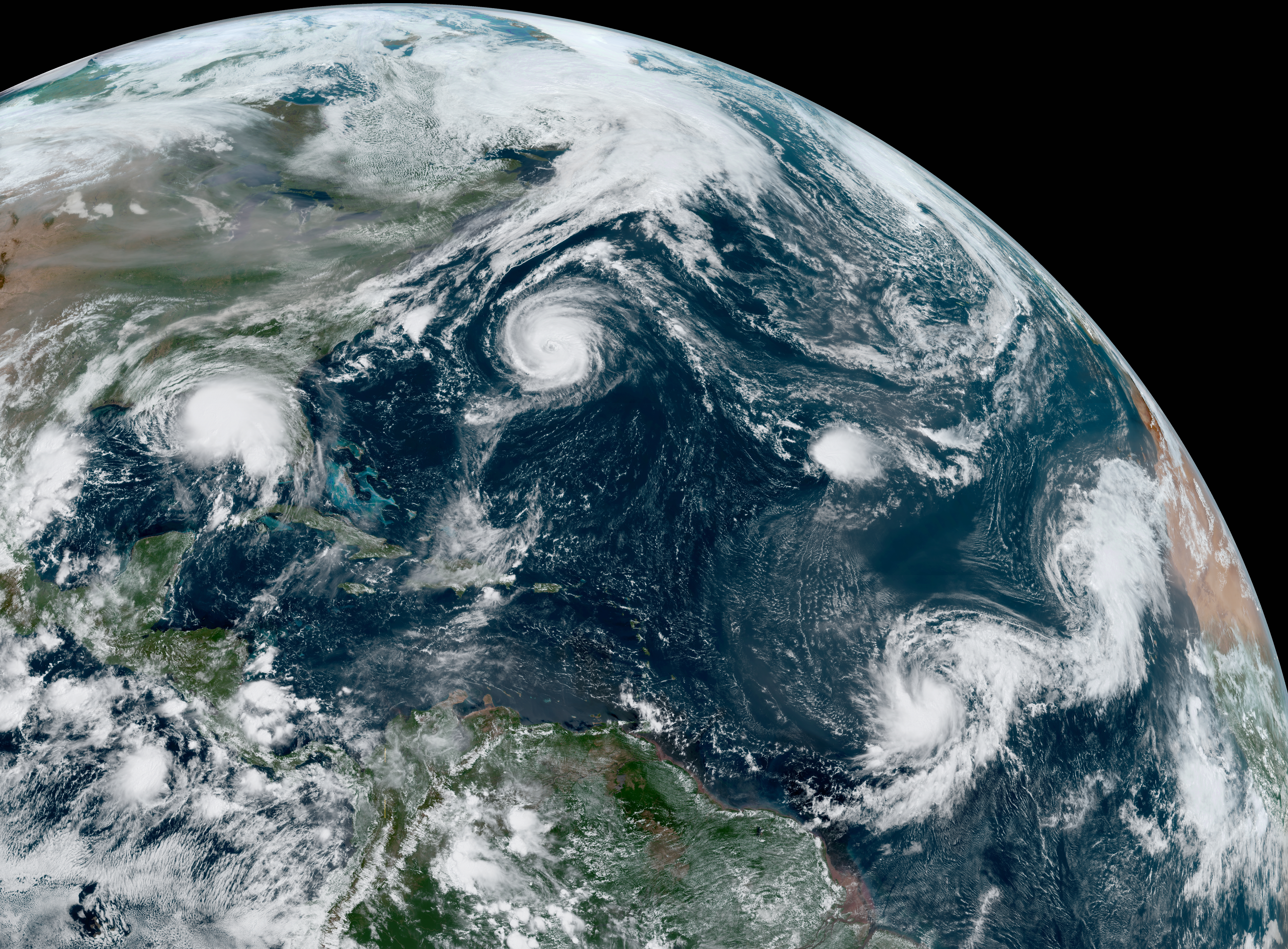
Five simultaneous tropical cyclones active in the Atlantic on September 14: Sally (left), Paulette (center left), Rene (center right), Teddy (bottom right), and Vicky (far right)

- 00:00 UTC (8:00 p.m. AST, September 13) at 12.9°N 38.7°W – Tropical Depression Twenty strengthens into Tropical Storm Teddy about 1,125 mi (1,811 km) east of the Lesser Antilles.
- 00:00 UTC (11:00 p.m. CVT, September 13) at 17.5°N 28.2°W – Tropical Depression Twenty-One forms from a tropical wave about 195 mi (315 km) west of the northwesternmost of the Cabo Verde Islands.
- 06:00 UTC (1:00 a.m. CDT) at 28.2°N 86.5°W – Tropical Storm Sally becomes a Category 1 hurricane about 145 mi (233 km) south of Pensacola, Florida.
- 06:00 UTC (5:00 a.m. CVT) at 18.0°N 28.3°W – Tropical Depression Twenty-One strengthens and becomes Tropical Storm Vicky about 215 mi (346 km) west-northwest of the northwesternmost of the Cabo Verde Islands.
- 08:50 UTC (4:50 a.m. AST) at 32.3°N 64.7°W – Hurricane Paulette makes landfall near Tucker's Town, Bermuda, as a Category 2 hurricane with sustained winds of 100 mph (160 km/h) and a minimum pressure of 970 mbar (29 inHg).
- 15:00 UTC (11:00 a.m. AST) at 27.5°N 48.3°W – Tropical Depression Rene opens into a trough roughly 1,035–1,120 mi (1,666–1,802 km) northeast of the northern Leeward Islands and subsequently dissipates.
- 18:00 UTC (2:00 p.m. AST) at 33.9°N 64.4°W – Hurricane Paulette attains its peak intensity with maximum winds of 105 mph (169 km/h) and a minimum pressure of 965 mbar (28.5 inHg), about 115 mi (185 km) north of Bermuda.

September 15

- 12:00 UTC (8:00 a.m. AST) at 20.5°N 30.8°W – Tropical Storm Vicky reaches its peak intensity with sustained winds of 50 mph (80 km/h) and a pressure of 1,001 mbar (29.6 inHg), about 435 mi (700 km) northwest of the northwesternmost of the Cabo Verde Islands.

September 16

- 00:00 UTC (8:00 p.m. AST, September 15) at 14.7°N 48.0°W – Tropical Storm Teddy becomes a Category 1 hurricane about 805 mi (1,295 km) east-northeast of Barbados.
- 06:00 UTC (2:00 a.m. AST) at 41.2°N 50.8°W – Hurricane Paulette weakens to Category 1 strength, about 395 mi (636 km) east-southeast of Cape Race, Newfoundland.
- 06:00 UTC (1:00 a.m. CDT) at 29.9°N 87.9°W – Hurricane Sally intensifies to a Category 2 hurricane as its northern eyewall begins moving onshore at Baldwin County, Alabama.
- 09:45 UTC (4:45 a.m. CDT) at 30.3°N 87.7°W – Hurricane Sally reaches its peak intensity as it makes landfall near Gulf Shores, Alabama, with maximum sustained winds of 110 mph (180 km/h) and a minimum central pressure of 965 mbar (28.5 inHg).
- 12:00 UTC (8:00 a.m. AST) at 42.6°N 46.9°W – Hurricane Paulette completes its transition into a hurricane-force extratropical cyclone about 405 mi (652 km) southeast of Cape Race, Newfoundland.
- 12:00 UTC (8:00 a.m. AST) at 16.1°N 49.3°W – Hurricane Teddy strengthens to Category 2 intensity about 720 mi (1,160 km) east-northeast of Barbados.
- 18:00 UTC (1:00 p.m. CDT) at 31.1°N 87.2°W – Hurricane Sally weakens to a tropical storm about 60 mi (97 km) northeast of Gulf Shores.

September 17

- 06:00 UTC (1:00 a.m. CDT) at 32.1°N 86.1°W – Tropical Storm Sally weakens to a tropical depression about 25 mi (40 km) south-southeast of Montgomery, Alabama.
- 06:00 UTC (6:00 a.m. GMT) at 38.3°N 18.1°W – Subtropical Storm Alpha develops from an extratropical low-pressure area about 405 mi (650 km) east of the Azores. (Note: The determination that the system had become a subtropical storm at around 06:00 UTC (6:00 a.m. GMT) on September 17 was made by the National Hurricane Center during post-storm analysis. At the time, it was determined that Subtropical Storm Alpha had formed at 16:30 UTC (4:30 p.m. GMT) on September 18 as it was approaching the coast of Portugal.)
- 12:00 UTC (7:00 a.m. CDT) at 32.6°N 85.2°W – Tropical Depression Sally becomes an extratropical low over eastern Alabama, and is subsequently absorbed within a cold front.
- 12:00 UTC (8:00 a.m. AST) at 18.9°N 52.8°W – Hurricane Teddy strengthens to a Category 3 hurricane about 575 mi (925 km) east-northeast of Guadeloupe.
- 12:00 UTC (8:00 a.m. AST) at 21.6°N 37.6°W – Tropical Storm Vicky weakens to a tropical depression, about 865 mi (1,392 km) west-northwest of the northwesternmost of the Cabo Verde Islands.
- 12:00 UTC (7:00 a.m. CDT) at 21.5°N 94.7°W – Tropical Depression Twenty-Two forms over the southwestern Gulf of Mexico from an area of disturbed weather, about 350 mi (565 km) south-southeast of Brownsville, Texas.
- 18:00 UTC (2:00 p.m. AST) at 19.7°N 53.7°W – Hurricane Teddy attains Category 4 strength about 540 mi (870 km) east-northeast of Guadeloupe.
- 18:00 UTC (2:00 p.m. AST) at 21.3°N 38.7°W – Tropical Depression Vicky becomes a remnant low about 920 mi (1,480 km) west-northwest of the northwesternmost Cabo Verde Islands, and subsequently dissipates.
- 18:00 UTC (2:00 p.m. AST) at 10.8°N 28.1°W – Tropical Storm Wilfred develops from a tropical wave about 345 mi (555 km) southwest of the southernmost Cabo Verde Islands.

September 18

- 00:00 UTC (8:00 p.m. AST, September 17) at 20.4°N 54.4°W – Hurricane Teddy reaches its peak intensity with 140 mph (230 km/h) maximum winds and a minimum pressure of 945 mbar (27.9 inHg), about 525 mi (845 km) east-northeast of Guadeloupe.
- 00:00 UTC (12:00 a.m. GMT) at 36.7°N 13.1°W – Subtropical Storm Alpha reaches its peak intensity with sustained winds of 50 mph (80 km/h) and a minimum pressure of 996 mbar (29.4 inHg), about 260 mi (420 km) west-southwest of Lisbon, Portugal.
- 00:00 UTC (8:00 p.m. AST, September 17) at 11.1°N 29.3°W – Tropical Storm Wilfred attains its peak intensity with sustained winds of 40 mph (64 km/h) and a minimum pressure of 1,006 mbar (29.7 inHg), about 830 mi (1,340 km) west-southwest of the Cabo Verde Islands.
- 12:00 UTC (8:00 a.m. AST) at 21.7°N 55.8°W – Hurricane Teddy weakens to Category 3 strength about 505 mi (813 km) east-northeast of Guadeloupe.
- 18:00 UTC (1:00 p.m. CDT) at 24.1°N 93.1°W – Tropical Depression Twenty-Two becomes Tropical Storm Beta about 300 mi (480 km) southeast of Brownsville.
- 18:40 UTC (6:40 p.m. GMT) at 40.0°N 8.9°W – Subtropical Storm Alpha makes landfall about 10 mi (15 km) south of Figueira da Foz, Portugal, with winds estimated at 50 mph (80 km/h).

September 19

- 00:00 UTC (12:00 a.m. GMT) at 40.6°N 7.6°W – Subtropical Storm Alpha becomes a subtropical depression inland over north-central Portugal, about 15 mi (24 km) southeast of Viseu, and later dissipates.
- 06:00 UTC (2:00 a.m. AST) at 37.7°N 31.1°W – Extratropical Cyclone Paulette weakens to an extratropical low about 115 mi (185 km) southwest of the Azores.

September 20

- 00:00 UTC (8:00 p.m. AST, September 19) at 26.9°N 60.8°W – Hurricane Teddy weakens to Category 2 strength about 435 mi (700 km) south-southeast of Bermuda.
- 12:00 UTC (7:00 a.m. CDT) at 27.1°N 92.8°W – Tropical Storm Beta reaches its peak wind speed of 65 mph (105 km/h), about 200 mi (320 km) southeast of Galveston, Texas.
- 12:00 UTC (8:00 a.m. AST) at 15.4°N 43.2°W – Tropical Storm Wilfred weakens to a tropical depression roughly 1,150 mi (1,850 km) east of the Leeward Islands.
- 18:00 UTC (6:00 p.m. GMT) at 34.7°N 30.6°W – Remnants of Paulette reorganize into a tropical storm about 230 mi (370 km) south-southwest of the Azores.
- 18:00 UTC (2:00 p.m. AST) at 28.5°N 63.3°W – Hurricane Teddy weakens to a Category 1 hurricane about 270 mi (430 km) south-southeast of Bermuda.

September 21

- 00:00 UTC (7:00 p.m. CDT, September 20) at 27.5°N 94.1°W – Tropical Storm Beta reaches a minimum pressure of 993 mbar (29.3 inHg), about 120 mi (190 km) south-southeast of Galveston.
- 00:00 UTC (8:00 p.m. AST, September 20) at 15.8°N 46.7°W – Tropical Depression Wilfred degenerates into an trough approximately 920 mi (1,480 km) east of the northernmost Leeward Islands.

September 22

- 00:00 UTC (12:00 a.m. GMT) at 33.8°N 26.3°W – Tropical Storm Paulette reaches a secondary peak wind speed of 60 mph (97 km/h), about 1,060 mi (1,710 km) south-southeast of the Azores.
- 00:00 UTC (8:00 p.m. AST, September 21) at 34.6°N 61.4°W – Hurricane Teddy re-strengthens to a Category 2 hurricane about 250 mi (400 km) northeast of Bermuda.
- 02:45 UTC (9:45 p.m. CDT, September 21) at 28.4°N 96.4°W – Tropical Storm Beta makes landfall over the southern end of the Matagorda Peninsula, near Port O'Connor, Texas, with maximum sustained winds near 50 mph (80 km/h).
- 12:00 UTC (12:00 p.m. GMT) at 34.8°N 23.1°W – Tropical Storm Paulette degenerates into a remnant low again about 690 mi (1,110 km) southeast of the Azores, and subsequently dissipates.
- 12:00 UTC (8:00 a.m. AST) at 39.1°N 63.5°W – Hurricane Teddy reaches a secondary peak wind speed of 105 mph (169 km/h), about 365 mi (587 km) south of Halifax, Nova Scotia.
- 18:00 UTC (2:00 p.m. AST) at 40.3°N 64.2°W – Hurricane Teddy weakens to Category 1 strength, about 300 mi (480 km) south of Halifax.
- 18:00 UTC (1:00 p.m. CDT) at 28.9°N 96.5°W – Tropical Storm Beta weakens to a tropical depression inland, about 30 mi (48 km) north-northwest of Matagorda Bay.

September 23

- 00:00 UTC (8:00 p.m. AST, September 22) at 41.9°N 64.2°W – Hurricane Teddy transitions to an extratropical low about 190 mi (305 km) south of Halifax, and is subsequently absorbed by a larger non-tropical low.
- 00:00 UTC (7:00 p.m. CDT, September 22) at 29.0°N 95.8°W – Tropical Depression Beta becomes extratropical about 75 mi (121 km) east of Victoria, and subsequently dissipates.

=== October ===
October 2

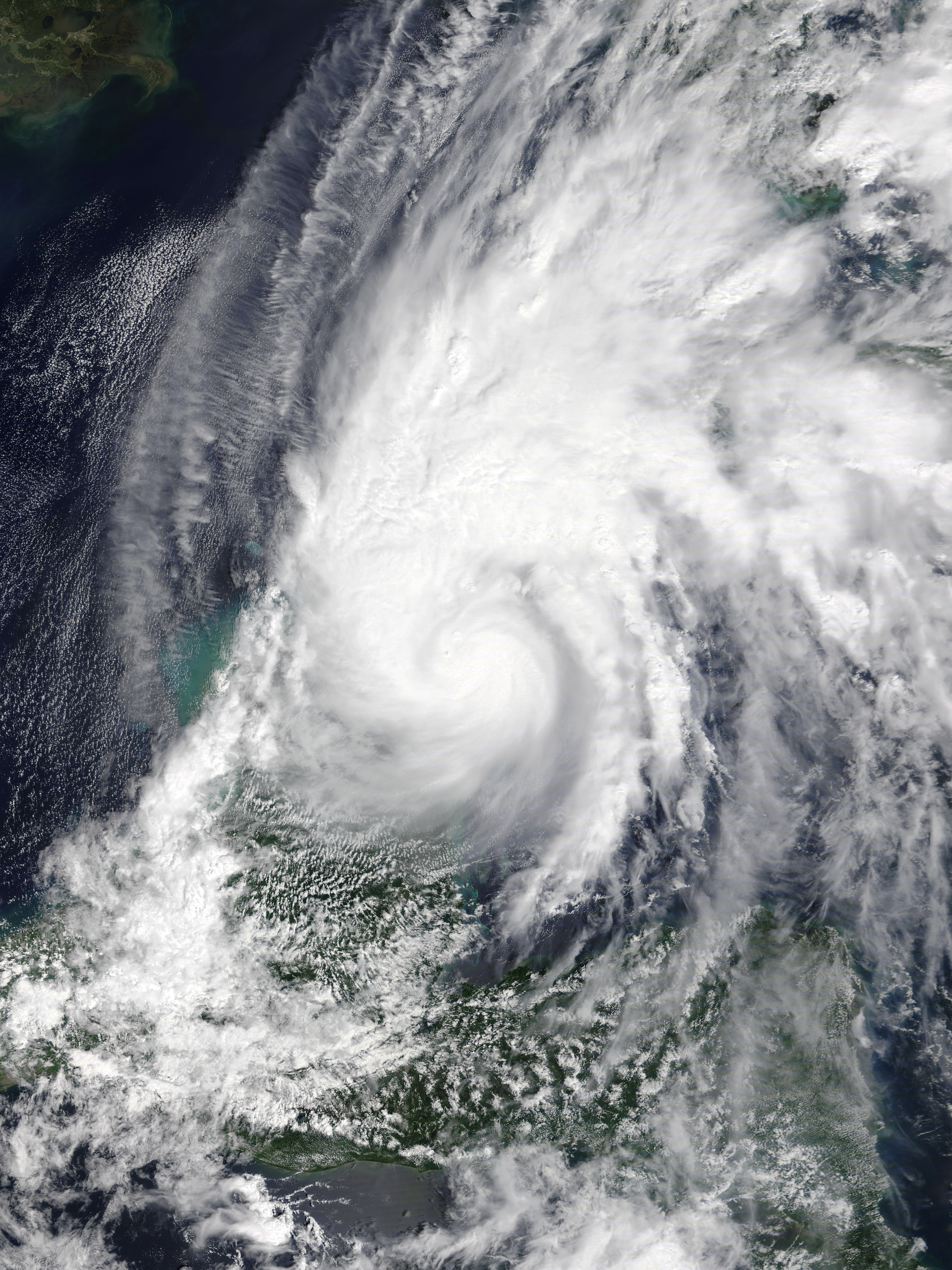
Hurricane Gamma making landfall on the Yucatán Peninsula at peak intensity on October 3

- 06:00 UTC (2:00 a.m. EDT) at 17.2°N 83.9°W – Tropical Depression Twenty-Five forms from a tropical wave about 300 mi (480 km) southeast of Cozumel, Quintana Roo.
- 18:00 UTC (2:00 p.m. EDT) at 18.4°N 85.0°W – Tropical Depression Twenty-Five strengthens to become Tropical Storm Gamma about 140 mi (225 km) south-southeast of Cozumel.

October 3

- 16:45 UTC (11:45 a.m. CDT) at 20.2°N 87.4°W – Tropical Storm Gamma attains Category 1 hurricane strength and its peak intensity with maximum winds 75 mph (121 km/h) and a minimum pressure of 978 mbar (28.9 inHg), as it makes landfall near Tulum, Quintana Roo.
- 18:00 UTC (1:00 p.m. CDT) at 20.4°N 87.5°W – Hurricane Gamma weakens to a tropical storm inland, about 15 mi (24 km) north-northwest of Tulum.

October 4

- 06:00 UTC (1:00 a.m. CDT) at 21.8°N 88.2°W – Tropical Storm Gamma emerges over the Gulf of Mexico with winds of 50 mph (80 km/h), about 100 mi (160 km) west-northwest of Cancún, Quintana Roo.
- 18:00 UTC (1:00 p.m. CDT) at 22.7°N 87.7°W – Tropical Storm Gamma reaches a secondary peak wind speed of 65 mph (105 km/h), about 60 mi (97 km) north-northeast of Río Lagartos, Yucatán.
- 18:00 UTC (2:00 p.m. EDT) at 16.4°N 76.2°W – Tropical Depression Twenty-Six forms from a tropical wave about 105 mi (169 km) south of Kingston, Jamaica.

October 5

- 12:00 UTC (8:00 a.m. EDT) at 16.4°N 78.4°W – Tropical Depression Twenty-Six becomes Tropical Storm Delta about 150 mi (240 km) south-southwest of Montego Bay, Jamaica.
- 18:00 UTC (1:00 p.m. CDT) at 22.3°N 87.9°W – Tropical Storm Gamma weakens to a tropical depression about 140 mi (230 km) north-northwest of Cozumel.

October 6

- 00:00 UTC (8:00 p.m. EDT, October 5) at 16.6°N 79.8°W – Tropical Storm Delta becomes a Category 1 hurricane about 180 mi (290 km) southwest of Montego Bay.
- 03:00 UTC (10:00 p.m. CDT, October 5) at 21.6°N 88.4°W – Tropical Depression Gamma makes landfall near San Felipe, Yucatán, and its circulation later dissipates over the Yucatán Peninsula.
- 12:00 UTC (8:00 a.m. EDT) at 17.8°N 82.0°W – Hurricane Delta strengthens to Category 3 intensity about 270 mi (435 km (270 mi) west of Montego Bay.
- 18:00 UTC (1:00 p.m. EDT) at 18.5°N 83.3°W – Hurricane Delta reaches its peak intensity as a category 4 hurricane with maximum winds of 140 mph (230 km/h) and a minimum pressure of 953 mbar (28.1 inHg), about 200 mi (320 km) south of the Isle of Youth, Cuba.

October 7

- 06:00 UTC (1:00 a.m. CDT) at 20.1°N 85.9°W – Hurricane Delta weakens to Category 2 intensity about 70 mi (115 km) east of Cozumel.
- 10:30 UTC (5:30 a.m. CDT) at 20.8°N 86.9°W – Hurricane Delta makes its first landfall near Puerto Morelos, Quintana Roo, with winds of around 105 mph (170 km/h).
- 18:00 UTC (1:00 p.m. CDT) at 20.8°N 86.9°W – Hurricane Delta emerges over the Gulf of Mexico with Category 1 winds estimated at near 85 mph (137 km/h), about 115 mi (185 km) west of Cabo Catoche, Quintana Roo.

October 8

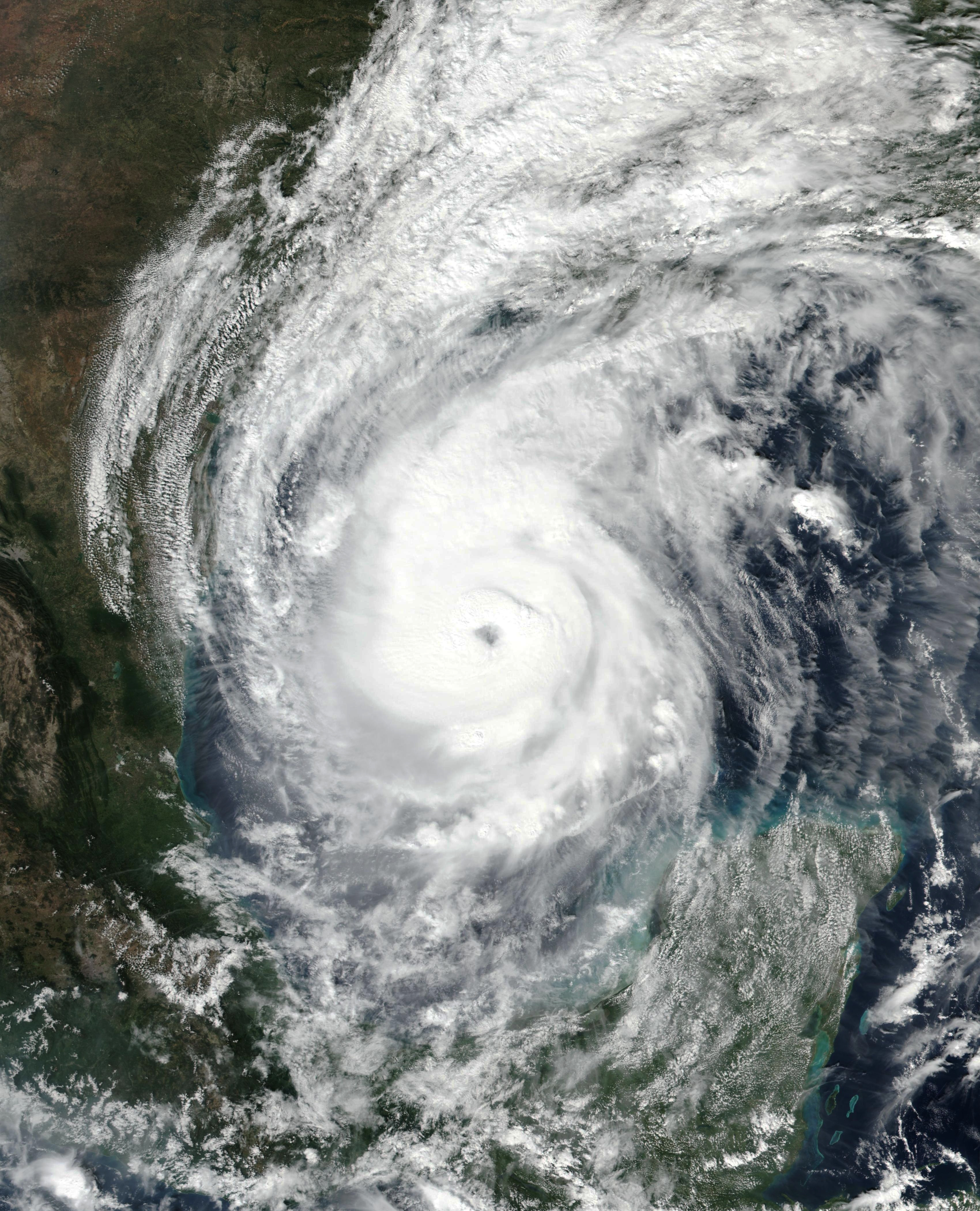
Hurricane Delta nearing its secondary peak intensity on October 8

- 06:00 UTC (1:00 a.m. CDT) at 23.0°N 91.4°W – Hurricane Delta re-strengthens to Category 2 intensity about 485 mi (781 km) south-southeast of the Texas–Louisiana border.
- 18:00 UTC (1:00 p.m. CDT) at 24.5°N 93.1°W – Hurricane Delta re-strengthens to a Category 3 hurricane about 345 mi (555 km) south-southeast of the Texas–Louisiana border.

October 9

- 00:00 UTC (7:00 p.m. CDT, October 8) at 25.3°N 93.5°W – Hurricane Delta reaches its secondary peak intensity with sustained winds of 120 mph (190 km/h) and a central pressure of 953 mbar (28.1 inHg), about 305 mi (491 km) south-southeast of the Texas–Louisiana border.
- 18:00 UTC (1:00 p.m. CDT) at 28.7°N 93.6°W – Hurricane Delta weakens to Category 2 intensity about 70 mi (110 km) south-southeast of the Texas–Louisiana border.
- 23:00 UTC (6:00 p.m. CDT) at 29.8°N 93.1°W – Hurricane Delta makes landfall near Creole, Louisiana, with maximum winds of about 100 mph (160 km/h).

October 10

- 00:00 UTC (7:00 p.m. CDT, October 9) at 30.0°N 93.0°W – Hurricane Delta weakens to Category 1 strength inland, about 15 ;mi (25 km) north-northeast of Creole.
- 06:00 UTC (1:00 a.m. CDT) at 31.2°N 92.3°W – Hurricane Delta weakens to tropical storm intensity about 110 mi (180 km) northeast of Creole.
- 18:00 UTC (1:00 p.m. CDT) at 33.3°N 90.6°W – Tropical Storm Delta becomes extratropical over western Mississippi, about 285 mi (459 km) northeast of Creole, and subsequently dissipates.

October 19

- 06:00 UTC (2:00 a.m. AST) at 25.5°N 55.9°W – Tropical Depression Twenty-Seven forms from a non-tropical low about 830 mi (1,335 km) east of Bermuda.
- 12:00 UTC (8:00 a.m. AST), at 25.4°N 55.6°W – Tropical Depression Twenty-Seven becomes Tropical Storm Epsilon about 720 mi (1,160 km) southeast of Bermuda.

October 21

- 00:00 UTC (8:00 p.m. AST, October 20) at 28.3°N 56.3°W – Tropical Storm Epsilon becomes a Category 1 hurricane about 580 mi (930 km) east-southeast of Bermuda.
- 12:00 UTC (8:00 a.m. AST) at 28.9°N 58.7°W – Hurricane Epsilon strengthens to Category 2 intensity, about 425 mi (684 km) east-southeast of Bermuda.
- 18:00 UTC (2:00 p.m. AST) at 29.3°N 59.6°W – Hurricane Epsilon strengthens to Category 3 intensity, about 365 mi (587 km) east-southeast of Bermuda.

October 22

- 00:00 UTC (8:00 p.m. AST, October 21) at 29.5°N 60.4°W – Hurricane Epsilon reaches peak intensity with maximum winds of 115 mph (185 km/h) and a minimum pressure of 952 mbar (28.1 inHg) while about 345 mi (555 km), southeast of Bermuda.
- 06:00 UTC (2:00 a.m. AST) at 30.2°N 60.9°W – Hurricane Epsilon weakens to Category 2 intensity, about 285 mi (459 km) east-southeast of Bermuda.
- 12:00 UTC (8:00 a.m. AST) at 30.8°N 61.3°W – Hurricane Epsilon weakens to Category 1 intensity, about 235 mi (378 km) east-southeast of Bermuda.

October 24

- 12:00 UTC (8:00 a.m. EDT) at 18.4°N 82.6°W – Tropical Depression Twenty-Eight forms from the combination of a tropical wave and a mid-level trough about 70 mi (115 km) southwest of Grand Cayman.

October 25

- 00:00 UTC (8:00 p.m. EDT, October 24) at 18.0°N 83.2°W – Tropical Depression Twenty-Eight strengthens into Tropical Storm Zeta, about 270 mi (430 km) east-southeast of Cozumel, Quintana Roo.
- 18:00 UTC (2:00 p.m. AST) at 45.0°N 46.9°W – Hurricane Epsilon weakens to tropical storm strength about (320 mi (510 km) southeast of Cape Race, Newfoundland.

October 26

- 06:00 UTC (6:00 a.m. GMT) at 49.5°N 34.7°W – Tropical Storm Epsilon becomes extratropical about 565 mi (909 km) east of Cape Race, Newfoundland, and later merges with a larger extratropical low.
- 06:00 UTC (2:00 a.m. EDT) at 18.5°N 84.1°W – Tropical Storm Zeta strengthens to Category 1 intensity, about 230 mi (370 km) southeast of Cozumel.

October 27

- 03:55 UTC (10:55 p.m. CDT, October 26) at 20.4°N 87.4°W – Hurricane Zeta makes landfall near Ciudad Chemuyil, Quintana Roo, with an estimated intensity of 85 mph (135 km/h).
- 12:00 UTC (7:00 a.m. CDT) at 21.3°N 89.0°W – Hurricane Zeta weakens to a tropical storm inland about 120 mi (190 km) northwest of Ciudad Chemuyil, and then emerges over the southern Gulf of Mexico later that morning.

October 28

- 06:00 UTC (1:00 a.m. CDT) at 24.4°N 91.5°W – Tropical Storm Zeta again becomes a Category 1 hurricane, about 395 mi (636 km) south of New Orleans, Louisiana.
- 18:00 UTC (1:00 p.m. CDT) at 28.0°N 91.1°W – Hurricane Zeta strengthens to Category 2 intensity, about 150 mi (240 km) south-southwest of New Orleans.
- 21:00 UTC (4:00 p.m. CDT) at 29.2°N 90.6°W – Hurricane Zeta becomes a Category 3 hurricane and attains its peak intensity, with maximum sustained winds of 115 mph (185 km/h) and a minimum barometric pressure of 970 mbar (29 inHg), while simultaneously making its second landfall near Cocodrie, Louisiana.

October 29

- 00:00 UTC (7:00 p.m. CDT, October 28) at 30.2°N 89.9°W – Hurricane Zeta weakens to Category 2 intensity inland about 15 mi (24 km) north-northeast of New Orleans.
- 06:00 UTC (1:00 a.m. CDT) at 32.8°N 87.5°W – Hurricane Zeta weakens to a tropical storm about 30 mi (48 km) south of Tuscaloosa, Alabama.
- 18:00 UTC (2:00 p.m. EDT) at 37.8°N 78.2°W – Tropical Storm Zeta transitions into a post-tropical cyclone over central Virginia, and later dissipates.

October 31

- 18:00 UTC (2:00 p.m. EDT) at 14.9°N 72.4°W – Tropical Depression Twenty-Nine forms about 105 mi (169 km) south of Pedernales, Dominican Republic.

=== November ===
November 1

- 00:00 UTC (8:00 p.m. EDT October 31) at 14.9°N 73.6°W – Tropical Depression Twenty-Nine strengthens into Tropical Storm Eta about 300 mi (480 km) southeast of Kingston, Jamaica.

November 2

- 06:00 UTC (1:00 a.m. EST) at 14.9°N 80.4°W – Tropical Storm Eta becomes a hurricane about 310 mi (500 km) south of Grand Cayman.
- 12:00 UTC (7:00 a.m. EST) at 14.8°N 81.2°W – Hurricane Eta strengthens to Category 2 intensity, about 140 mi (230 km) east of Cabo Gracias a Dios on the Honduras–Nicaragua border.
- 15:00 UTC (10:00 a.m. EST) at 14.8°N 81.5°W – Hurricane Eta strengthens to Category 3 intensity, about 115 mi (185 km) east of Cabo Gracias a Dios.
- 18:00 UTC (1:00 p.m. EST) at 14.7°N 82.0°W – Hurricane Eta strengthens to Category 4 intensity, about 85 mi (137 km) east of Cabo Gracias a Dios.

November 3

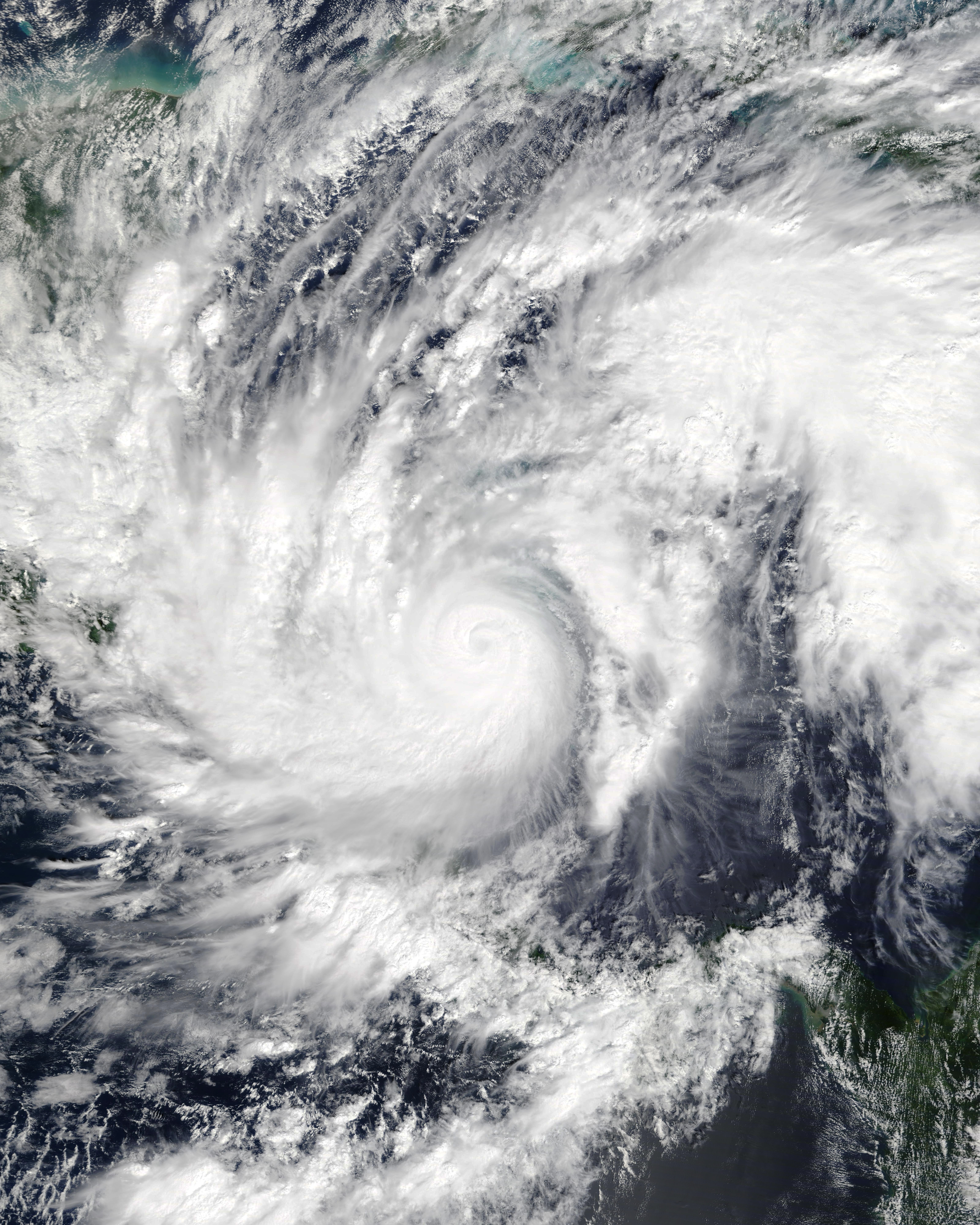
Hurricane Eta shortly before landfall in Nicaragua on November 3

- 00:00 UTC (7:00 p.m. EST, November 2) at 14.3°N 82.5°W – Hurricane Eta attains maximum sustained winds of 150 mph (240 km/h) and a minimum central pressure of 929 mbar (27.4 inHg), about 65 mi (105 km) east-southeast of Puerto Cabezas, Nicaragua.
- 06:00 UTC (1:00 a.m. EST) at 14.0°N 82.8°W – Hurricane Eta attains its peak intensity when its minimum pressure falls to 922 mbar (27.2 inHg), about 40 mi (64 km) east of Puerto Cabezas.
- 21:00 UTC (4:00 p.m. EST) at 13.8°N 83.5°W – Hurricane Eta makes landfall about 15 mi (24 km) south-southwest of Puerto Cabezas, with maximum sustained winds of 140 mph (230 km/h).

November 4

- 00:00 UTC (7:00 p.m. EST, November 3) at 13.8°N 83.7°W – Hurricane Eta weakens to Category 2 intensity about 25 mi (40 km) southwest of Puerto Cabezas.
- 12:00 UTC (7:00 a.m. EST) at 13.8°N 84.9°W – Hurricane Eta weakens to a tropical storm about 100 mi (160 km) west-southwest of Puerto Cabezas.

November 5

- 00:00 UTC (6:00 p.m. CST, November 4) at 14.0°N 86.0°W – Tropical Storm Eta weakens to a tropical depression about 80 mi (130 km) east of Tegucigalpa, Honduras.
- 06:00 UTC (12:00 a.m. CST) at 14.2°N 86.7°W – Tropical Depression Eta degenerates to a disturbance about 35 mi (56 km) east of Tegucigalpa. (Note: Operationally, the National Hurricane Center continued issuing advisories on Tropical Depression Eta due to uncertainties about whether or not the surface circulation had dissipated.)

November 6

- 00:00 UTC (6:00 p.m. CST, November 5) at 16.2°N 87.8°W – Remnants of Eta emerge over the Gulf of Honduras, about 65 mi (105 km) west-northwest of La Ceiba, Honduras.
- 06:00 UTC (12:00 a.m. CST) at 16.7°N 87.6°W – Remnants of Eta re-develop into a tropical depression, roughly 100 mi (160 km) west-northwest of La Ceiba.

November 7

- 06:00 UTC (12:00 a.m. EST) at 18.2°N 85.1°W – Tropical Depression Eta regains tropical storm status, about 310 mi (500 km) west-southwest of Grand Cayman.

November 8

- 09:00 UTC (4:00 a.m. EST) at 21.5°N 79.3°W – Tropical Storm Eta makes landfall about 30 mi (48 km) south-southeast of Sancti Spíritus, Cuba, with winds of 65 mph (105 km/h).
- 15:00 UTC (10:00 a.m. EST) at 22.5°N 79.2°W – Tropical Storm Eta emerges off the north coast of Cuba about 55 mi (89 km) west of Cunagua, Cuba.

November 9

- 04:00 UTC (11:00 p.m. EST November 8) at 24.9°N 80.7°W – Tropical Storm Eta makes landfall in the Florida Keys near Lower Matecumbe Key, about 30 mi (48 km) east-northeast of Marathon, Florida, then moves westward into the Gulf of Mexico.

November 10

- 00:00 UTC (12:00 a.m. GMT) at 28.8°N 41.0°W – Subtropical Storm Theta forms from an extratropical low about 985 mi (1,585 km) southwest of the Azores.
- 12:00 UTC (12:00 p.m. GMT) at 28.9°N 38.0°W – Subtropical Storm Theta attains a maximum wind speed of 70 mph (110 km/h) about 930 mi (1,500 km) southwest of the Azores.
- 18:00 UTC (6:00 p.m. GMT) at 29.0°N 36.7°W – Subtropical Storm Theta transitions to a tropical storm and reaches a minimum pressure of 987 mbar (29.1 inHg), about 870 mi (1,400 km) southwest of the Azores.

November 11

- 12:00 UTC (7:00 a.m. EST) at 25.8°N 83.9°W – Tropical Storm Eta re-strengthens into a hurricane and simultaneously reaches its second peak wind speed of 75 mph (121 km/h), about 165 mi (266 km) southwest of Clearwater, Florida.
- 18:00 UTC (1:00 p.m. EST) at 26.8°N 83.7°W – Hurricane Eta weakens to a tropical storm, about 100 mi (160 km) southwest of Clearwater.

November 12

- 09:00 UTC (4:00 a.m. EST) at 29.2°N 82.9°W – Tropical Storm Eta makes landfall about 5 mi (8.0 km) east of Cedar Key, Florida, with maximum sustained winds of 50 mph (80 km/h).
- 18:00 UTC (1:00 p.m. EST) at 30.9°N 81.3°W – Tropical Storm Eta emerges into the Atlantic Ocean about 40 mi (64 km) north-northeast of Jacksonville, Florida.

November 13

- 09:00 UTC (4:00 a.m. EST) at 33.3°N 76.8°W – Tropical Storm Eta becomes an extratropical low about 85 mi (137 km) southeast of Wilmington, North Carolina, and is later absorbed by another extratropical low.
- 12:00 UTC (7:00 a.m. EST) at 14.4°N 73.7°W – Tropical Depression Thirty-One forms from a tropical wave over the southern Caribbean about 185 mi (300 km) northwest of Aruba.
- 18:00 UTC (1:00 p.m. EST) at 14.0°N 74.1°W – Tropical Depression Thirty-One strengthens into Tropical Storm Iota about 330 mi (530 km) south-southeast of Kingston, Jamaica.

November 15

- 06:00 UTC (6:00 a.m. GMT) at 31.6°N 18.5°W – Tropical Storm Theta weakens to a tropical depression about 120 mi (195 km) southwest of Madeira Island.
- 06:00 UTC (1:00 a.m. EST) at 13.0°N 77.1°W – Tropical Storm Iota strengthens into a hurricane about 290 mi (470 km) southeast of Providencia Island, Colombia.
- 12:00 UTC (12:00 p.m. GMT) at 31.4°N 18.3°W – Tropical Depression Theta degenerates to a remnant low about 605 mi (974 km) southeast of the Azores, and later dissipates.

November 16

Satellite loop of Hurricane Iota rapidly strengthening to near peak intensity while approaching Nicaragua on November 16

- 00:00 UTC (7:00 p.m. EST, November 15) at 13.2°N 79.8°W – Hurricane Iota attains Category 2 strength about 110 mi (180 km) east-southeast of Providencia Island.
- 06:00 UTC (1:00 a.m. EST) at 13.4°N 80.7°W – Hurricane Iota rapidly intensifies to Category 4 strength about 45 mi (72 km) east-northeast of Providencia Island.
- 12:00 UTC (7:00 a.m. EST) at 13.5°N 81.5°W – Hurricane Iota attains its peak intensity with maximum winds of 155 mph (249 km/h) and a minimum pressure of 917 mbar (27.1 inHg), about 25 mi (40 km) northwest of Providencia Island.

November 17

- 03:40 UTC (10:40 p.m. EST, November 16) at 13.6°N 83.5°W – Hurricane Iota makes landfall near Haulover, Nicaragua, about 25 mi (40 km) south of Puerto Cabezas, with sustained winds of 145 mph (233 km/h).
- 06:00 UTC (1:00 a.m. EST) at 13.7°N 83.8°W – Hurricane Iota weakens to Category 3 strength about 40 mi (64 km) southwest of Puerto Cabezas.
- 12:00 UTC (7:00 a.m. EST) at 13.7°N 84.8°W – Hurricane Iota weakens to Category 1 strength about 90 mi (140 km) west-southwest of Puerto Cabezas.
- 18:00 UTC (12:00 p.m. CST) at 13.7°N 85.7°W – Hurricane Iota weakens to a tropical storm over western Nicaragua, about 105 mi (169 km) east of Tegucigalpa, Honduras.

November 18

- 12:00 UTC (6:00 a.m. CST) at 13.7°N 89.0°W – Tropical Storm Iota weakens to a tropical depression about 15 mi (24 km) east of San Salvador, El Salvador, and later dissipates.

November 30

- The 2020 Atlantic hurricane season officially ends.

== See also ==
- Lists of Atlantic hurricanes
- Timeline of the 2020 Pacific hurricane season
