= Tropical Storm Arthur (2020) =

Atlantic tropical storm

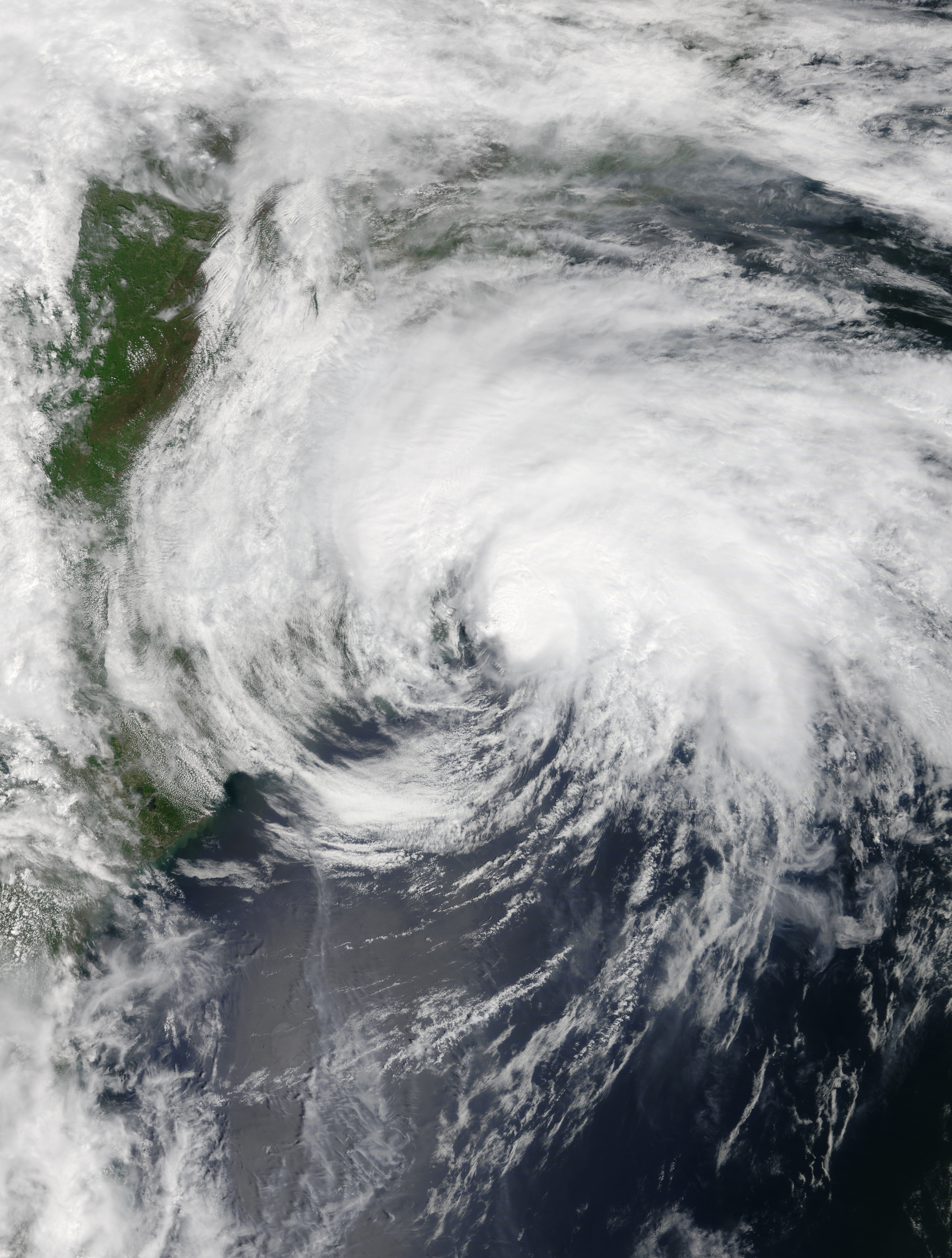
- Arthur off the east coast of North Carolina near peak intensity on May 18

Meteorological history
- Formed: May 16, 2020
- Extratropical: May 19, 2020
- Dissipated: May 21, 2020

Tropical storm
- 1-minute sustained (SSHWS/NWS)
- Highest winds: 60 mph (95 km/h)
- Lowest pressure: 990 mbar (hPa); 29.23 inHg

Overall effects
- Fatalities: None
- Damage: $112,000 (2020 USD)
- Areas affected: Cuba, South Florida, The Bahamas, North Carolina, Mid-Atlantic United States, Bermuda
- Part of the 2020 Atlantic hurricane season

Tropical Storm Arthur was a strong off-season tropical cyclone that impacted the East Coast of the United States in May 2020. The first of thirty-one depressions and thirty named storms of the extremely active 2020 Atlantic hurricane season, Arthur marked the record sixth consecutive year in the Atlantic basin with a tropical cyclone forming before June. It was one of two off-season storms in the season, alongside short-lived Tropical Storm Bertha. Arthur originated from a front that stalled over the Straits of Florida on May 10, which slowly drifted south for two days. The system became a tropical depression on May 16 north of The Bahamas. A day later, the system intensified into a tropical storm and was named Arthur. Arthur gradually intensified while tracking towards the Outer Banks of North Carolina, attaining its peak intensity with maximum 1-minute sustained winds of 60 mph (97 km/h) and a minimum central pressure of 990 mbar (29 inHg) on May 19, before skirting the region and becoming an extratropical cyclone. The cyclone then accelerated towards Bermuda and dissipated on May 21.

Arthur caused choppy seas and rip currents to much of the East Coast. In its formative stages, the storm brought severe weather, including hail and high winds, to southern Florida. In the state, heavy rain caused the ceiling of a house to collapse on a boy, injuring him. Tropical cyclone warnings and watches were issued for North Carolina, where Arthur brought heavy rain and tropical storm-force wind gusts to the coastline. Elsewhere, the storm caused gusty winds. No fatalities were reported from the storm, and according to the National Centers for Environmental Information, damage totaled $112,000 (2020 USD).

== Meteorological history ==
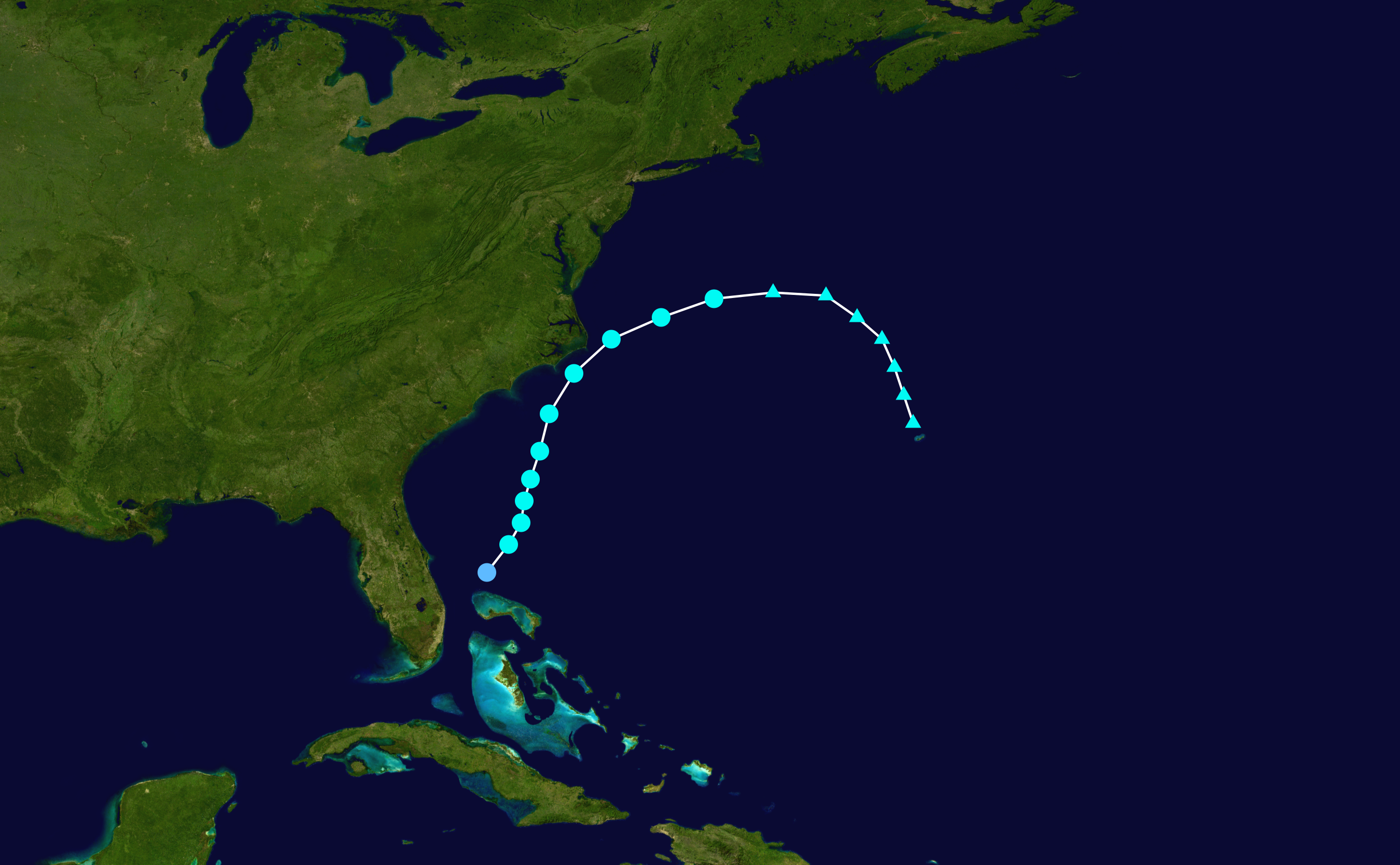
Map plotting the storm's track and intensity, according to the Saffir–Simpson scale Map key Saffir–Simpson scale Tropical depression (≤38 mph, ≤62 km/h) Tropical storm (39–73 mph, 63–118 km/h) Category 1 (74–95 mph, 119–153 km/h) Category 2 (96–110 mph, 154–177 km/h) Category 3 (111–129 mph, 178–208 km/h) Category 4 (130–156 mph, 209–251 km/h) Category 5 (≥157 mph, ≥252 km/h) Unknown Storm type Tropical cyclone Subtropical cyclone Extratropical cyclone, remnant low, tropical disturbance, or monsoon depression

Arthur's origins can be traced to a front that stalled over the Straits of Florida on May 10. On May 12, the National Hurricane Center (NHC) first discussed the possibility of subtropical development north of the Bahamas in relation with the front. Scattered convection, or thunderstorms, began to increase in association with an upper-level trough that moved into the Gulf of Mexico on May 14. Over the next day, the low moved north-northeastward, steered around a subtropical ridge to its east, and passed just east of the southeastern Florida coast. The center was located over the warm waters of the Gulf Stream. Convection began to slowly build around the center by early May 16, and Doppler weather radar showed a well-defined low-level circulation (LLC) had formed displaced just slightly east of the main thunderstorms. Based on this, the NHC upgraded the low to Tropical Depression One at 18:00 UTC on May 16 while located about 125 miles (201 km) east of Melbourne, Florida. The system was considered tropical instead of subtropical in nature due to persisting central deep convection and a tight radius of maximum winds.

Based on reports from a Hurricane Hunter aircraft of tropical-storm force winds, the NHC upgraded the system to Tropical Storm Arthur at 00:00 UTC on May 17. Being steered generally north-northeast for the next several hours, Arthur stayed well offshore of the coasts of Florida and Georgia. However, a mid-level trough centered over the United States caused Arthur to slowly be pushed northeastwards over a section of relatively cool waters and as a result most of the storm's convection became limited to the east of the circulation. Despite a lopsided structure, reconnaissance aircraft found Arthur slightly stronger, despite its appearance on satellite. Deep convection began to swiftly re-develop over the center as the storm began to move over warmer waters of the Gulf Stream, resulting in strengthening. Wind shear increased as Arthur neared North Carolina, which began separating the storm's convection from the LLC. The storm passed a mere 20 mi (32 km) southeast from Cape Hatteras early on May 18. By that time, the storm was interacting with a frontal boundary, which triggered extratropical transition. At 00:00 UTC on May 19, Arthur obtained its minimum central pressure of 990 mb (29 inHg) and its peak intensity of 60 mph (97 km/h). Six hours later, the storm completed its transition to an extratropical cyclone as a trailing warm front developed behind the now almost fully exposed LLC. The extratropical storm turned southeast on May 20 as the trough Arthur was interacting with passed the cyclone to the north. Arthur then tracked south towards Bermuda and dissipated early on May 21.

== Preparations and impact ==
=== Caribbean and Bermuda ===
The precursor to Arthur dropped heavy rainfall in Granma Province in Cuba on May 15, including 78 mm (3.1 in) of rainfall in Bayamo in only four hours. These rains resulted in indunated streets and flood damage to homes. In the Bahamas, squalls occurred on Grand Bahama island, where many were still recovering from the adverse effects of Hurricane Dorian, which devastated the country in September 2019. Gusty winds damaged tents and other temporary shelters across the island, and heavy rainfall caused some minimal flooding. However, since the strongest winds of the disturbance were located to the east of the center, damage was limited.

The extratropical remnants of Arthur brought gale-force winds to Bermuda. A sustained wind of 45 mph (72 km/h) was recorded at a weather observation site on Pearl Island, Bermuda. In addition, a gust of 63 mph (101 km/h) was recorded at the same spot.

=== United States ===
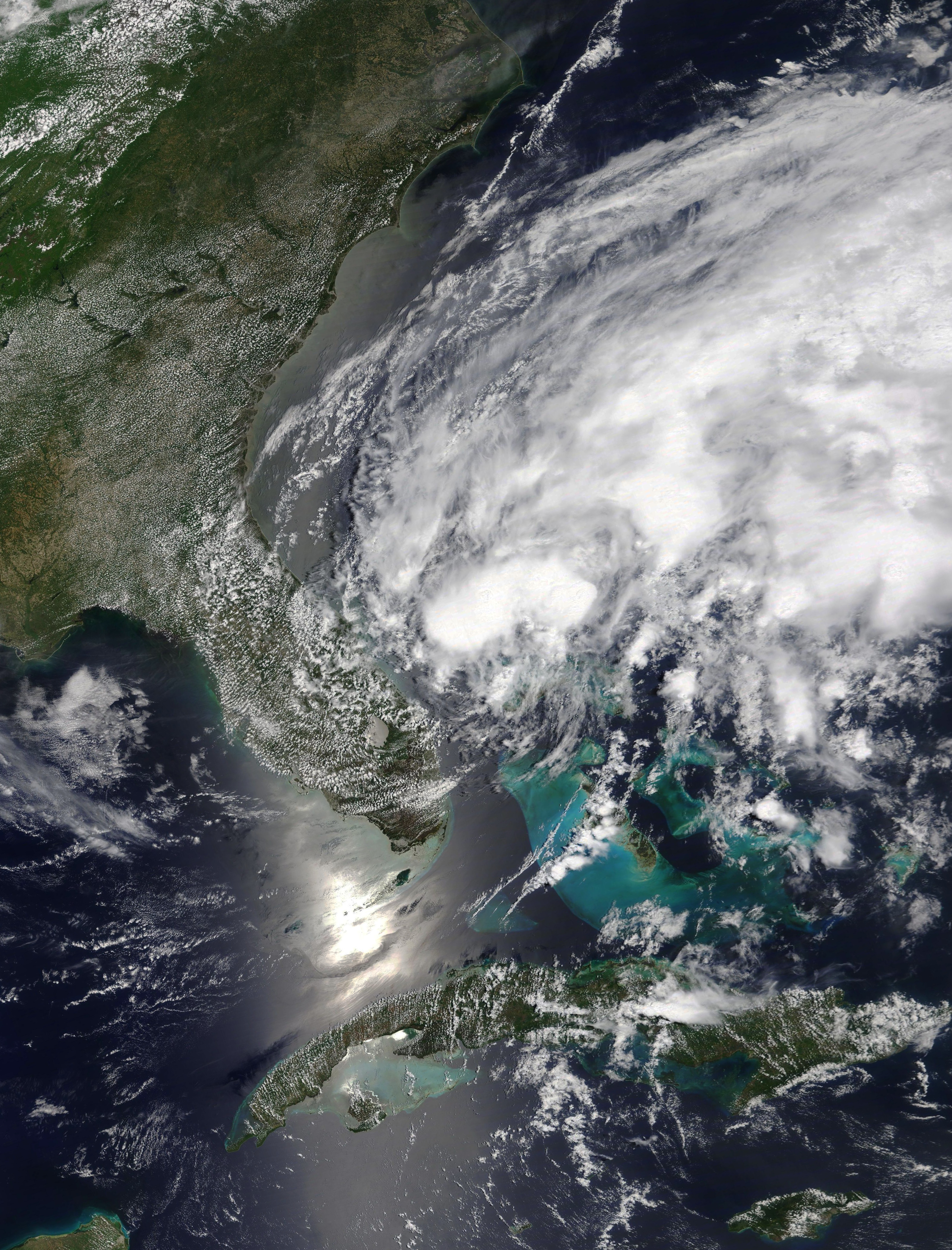
Tropical Depression One affecting Florida on May 16

==== Florida ====
Arthur caused dangerous water conditions at beaches as it passed east of Florida. Rip currents led to the water rescues of 70 people in Volusia County, 3 of whom were hospitalized. In addition, rainbands from the precursor disturbance to Arthur caused heavy rain and severe thunderstorms in South Florida. Over 4 in (100 mm) of rain fell in many sections of the Middle Keys and a peak rainfall total of 5.35 in (136 mm) fell in Marathon on May 14, where it was the tenth highest rainfall amount for the city on record and second most for May. Flash flood warnings were issued for large portions of Miami-Dade County on May 14, where street flooding was reported. Tropical storm-force wind gusts as well as waterspouts prompted the issuance of gale warnings and special marine warnings across the majority of South Florida. In St. Petersburg, a large tree was uprooted by strong winds from a squall line. Lightning from Arthur's rainbands caused a house fire in North Naples. No one was injured, and estimated damage was at $50,000. A trained weather spotter reported nickel-sized hail in Wellington. In the same town, a storm chaser reported a funnel cloud. Gale-force wind gusts were recorded in Coconut Grove, causing a large tree to fall onto a house. In Hollywood, heavy rain caused a ceiling to collapse on a 5-year-old boy and another family member. The boy was struck on the head by debris and took to the hospital. In Davie, a patio roof collapsed, destroying furniture. In the same town, a man was in critical condition after being electrocuted while fixing an electronic appliance in the rain. Damage across Florida reached $112,000.

==== North Carolina ====
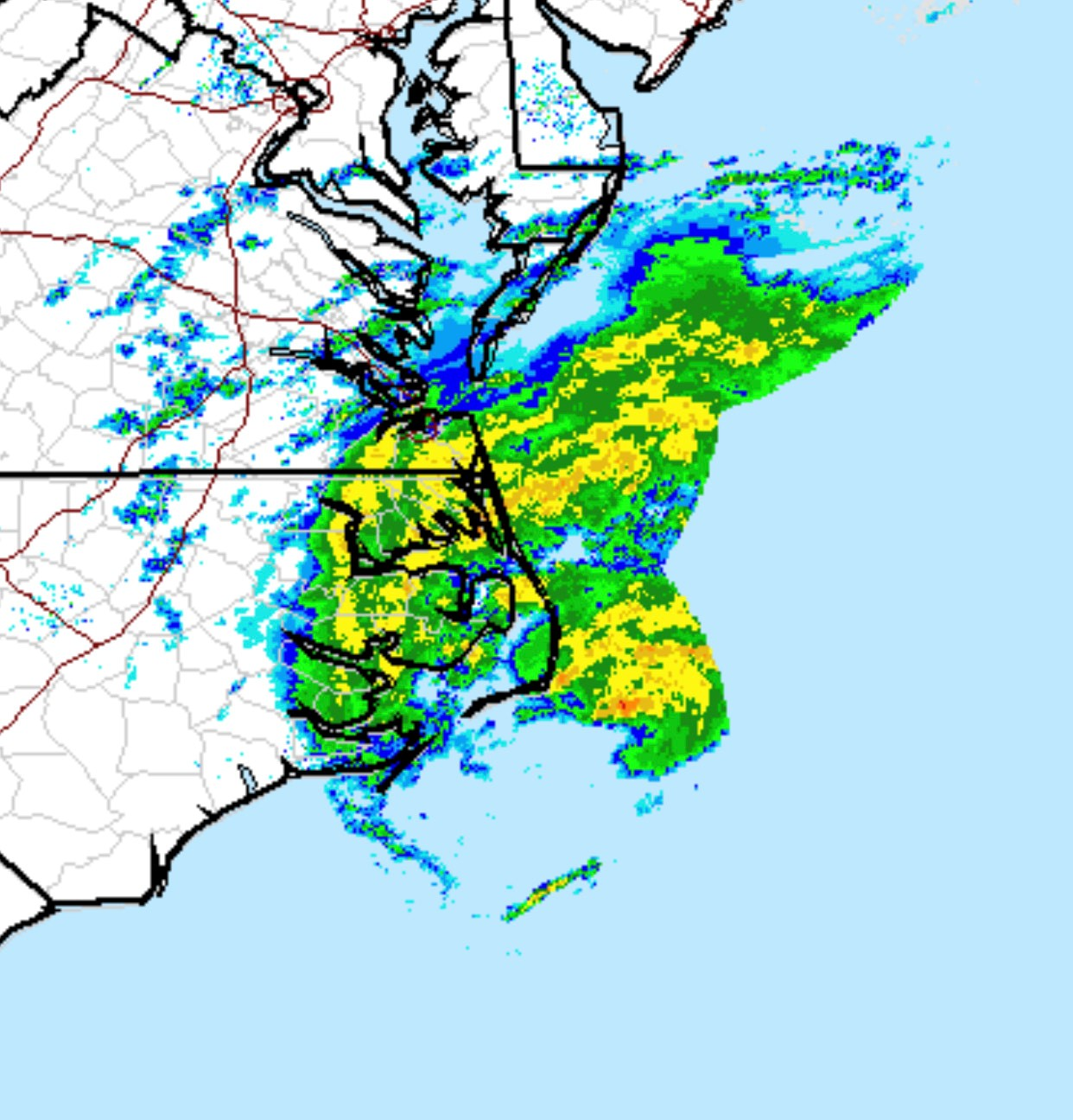
Arthur on its closest approach to North Carolina on radar on May 18

On May 16, tropical storm watches were issued from Surf City to Duck and Pamlico Sound to Albemarle Sound. A day later, these watches were upgraded to tropical storm warnings as Arthur moved closer towards the Outer Banks. In anticipation of inclement weather conditions associated with Tropical Storm Arthur, Dare County Public Works suspended residential and commercial trash collection in Colington Island, Kitty Hawk, Buxton, Frisco, and Hatteras. Commercial collection was also suspended for Manteo, Wanchese, Manns Harbor, Stumpy Point, Rodanthe, Waves, Salvo, and Avon. By late May 17, rough surf conditions were already being experienced on the southern portion of the Outer Banks. Torrential rainfall occurred as Arthur's outer rainbands scraped eastern North Carolina, with 4.92 in (125 mm) of rain falling in Newport within 6 hours, and many other locations recording at least 3 in (76 mm) of rain from the storm. Tropical storm-force wind gusts in Cape Hatteras were also recorded, although the lopsided nature of the storm kept the strongest winds offshore. The only tropical-storm force 1-minute sustained winds was at Alligator River Bridge in Tyrrell County. Wave heights as high as 12.5 ft (3.8 m) were recorded from buoys along the coast of the Outer Banks from Arthur. Due to flooding from Arthur, many highways in the Outer Banks and into mainland North Carolina were closed. SpaceX was also forced to delay the launch of several Starlink internet satellites due to adverse weather from Arthur affecting the recovery fleet. As Arthur moved away from the coast, tropical storm warnings were lifted as conditions gradually improved later in the evening.

==== Elsewhere ====
Purple and red flags were raised along the coasts of Georgia and South Carolina to alert the public for rip currents. Offshore Georgia, 3–6 ft (0.91–1.83 m) waves were reported. In James City County, Virginia, moderate coastal flooding was reported in some places. In southern New Jersey, Post-Tropical Cyclone Arthur, along with a large upper-level low to its west, caused coastal flooding and strong winds in towns on the Jersey Shore. Power lines were reported down in several towns. Trees were blown down on the Atlantic City Expressway and on U.S. Route 30 in Mullica Township.

Slightly further north, New York City experienced an excess of 30 mph (50 km/h) recorded wind gusts, partially associated from Tropical Storm Arthur, bringing cooler-than-average temperatures across the region.

== See also ==
- Timeline of the 2020 Atlantic hurricane season
- Tropical cyclones in 2020
- Other storms with the same name
- List of North Carolina hurricanes
- List of off-season Atlantic hurricanes
- Tropical Storm Ana (2015) – Similar formation from non-tropical origin, similar timeframes of duration, similar location.
