= Arthurs =

Arthurs may refer to:

== People ==
Surnames

- Charles Arthurs (1881–1932), English footballer
- Dante Arthurs (born 1984), convicted murderer
- Declan Arthurs (1965 – 1987), IRA member
- Faye Arthurs, New York City Ballet dancer
- George Arthurs (1875-1944), British songwriter and lyricist
- George Andrew Arthurs, Belizean LGBTQ rights activist
- Harry Arthurs (born 1935), Canadian lawyer, academic, and academic administrator
- Jack Arthurs (1922-2020), American businessman and politician
- James Arthurs (1866 – 1937), Canadian senator
- John Arthurs (born 1947), retired American basketball player
- Paul Arthurs (born 1965), member of the defunct British band Oasis
- Wayne Arthurs (tennis) (born 1971), Australian tennis player
- Wayne Arthurs (politician), member of the Legislative Assembly of Ontario

== Places ==
- Arthur's Hill, Newcastle upon Tyne, England
- Arthur's Pass (mountain pass), mountain pass in the Southern Alps of the South Island of New Zealand
- Arthur's Pass, village in the Southern Alps of the South Island of New Zealand
- Arthurs Creek, Victoria, small town in Victoria, Australia
- Arthur's Seat, 250.5 m (822 ft) peak in Edinburgh
- Arthurs Seat, Victoria, hill about 75 km south east of Melbourne, Australia

== Other uses ==
- Arthur's, a former gentlemen's club in London
- Arthur's Magazine, a former American literary magazine

== See also ==
- Clan Arthur, the Arthurs, a Scottish clan
- Arthur (surname), the Arthurs
- Arthur (disambiguation)
