= Arthur, Nevada =

Unincorporated community located in the State of Nevada, United States

- Unincorporated community
- Location within the state of Nevada Arthur, Nevada (the United States)
- Coordinates: 40°47′48″N 115°11′27″W
- Country: United States
- State: Nevada
- County: Elko
- Elevation: 6,349 ft (1,935 m)
- Time zone: UTC-8 (Pacific (PST))
  - Summer (DST): UTC-7 (PDT)
- GNIS feature ID: 858749

Arthur is an unincorporated community in Elko County, Nevada, United States.

== History ==
About fifty inhabitants lived in the Pole Canyon in 1881.

Two stories claim to explain the origin of the name of the town. The first is that the post office was named for Chester Arthur, then president of the United States. The second says that the town was named after the first postmaster, Arthur Gedne.

The post office at Arthur was in operation from April 1881 until May 1887, and then from September 1889 until June 1951.

The population was 12 in 1940.

Ranching was always the main economic activity in Arthur. Most ranches remained in the same family for generations. A number of ranches continue to operate in and around Arthur. Many 19th-century buildings are still in use.
