= Charles Arthurs =

English footballer

Personal information
- Full name: Charles Henry Arthurs
- Date of birth: 1881
- Place of birth: Kilnhurst, England
- Date of death: 1932 (aged 50–51)
- Position: Wing-half

Senior career*
Years	Team	Apps	(Gls)
1906–1907	Rotherham County		
1907–1908	Gainsborough Trinity	27	(1)
1908–1909	New Brompton		
1909–1910	Preston North End	8	(1)
1910–1911	New Brompton		
1911–1912	Rotherham County		
1912–1913	Worksop Town		
1913–1914	Merthyr Town		
1914–1915	Mardy		
1919	Pontypridd		
1920	Ebbw Vale		
Total		35	(2)
- * Club domestic league appearances and goals

Charles Henry Arthurs (1881–1932) was an English footballer who played in the Football League for Gainsborough Trinity and Preston North End.
