= List of storms named Arthur =

The name Arthur has been used for eight tropical cyclones in the Atlantic Ocean and for three in the South Pacific Ocean.

In the Atlantic:

- Tropical Storm Arthur (1984), formed on August 28, very late for the first storm; moved over Newfoundland as an extratropical storm; no damages or casualties.
- Tropical Storm Arthur (1990), formed in the Caribbean, strengthened to near hurricane-strength, and dissipated.
- Tropical Storm Arthur (1996), struck North Carolina as a weak tropical storm.
- Tropical Storm Arthur (2002), weak tropical storm that didn't significantly affect land.
- Tropical Storm Arthur (2008), formed quickly just before moving inland in Belize.
- Hurricane Arthur (2014), a category 2 hurricane that formed near the northwestern Bahamas and made landfall in North Carolina, producing minimal damage.
- Tropical Storm Arthur (2020), pre-season storm which neared North Carolina but moved out to sea before affecting Bermuda.
- Tropical Storm Arthur (2026), a short-lived and poorly-organized tropical storm that struck Texas.

In the South Pacific:

- Cyclone Arthur (1981), did not affect land.
- Cyclone Wasa-Arthur (1991), Arthur formed from the remnants of Wasa but was renamed.
- Cyclone Arthur (2007), formed in late January in the south Pacific Ocean briefly threatening the Cook Islands.
