= Hurricane Nana (2020) =

Category 1 Atlantic hurricane

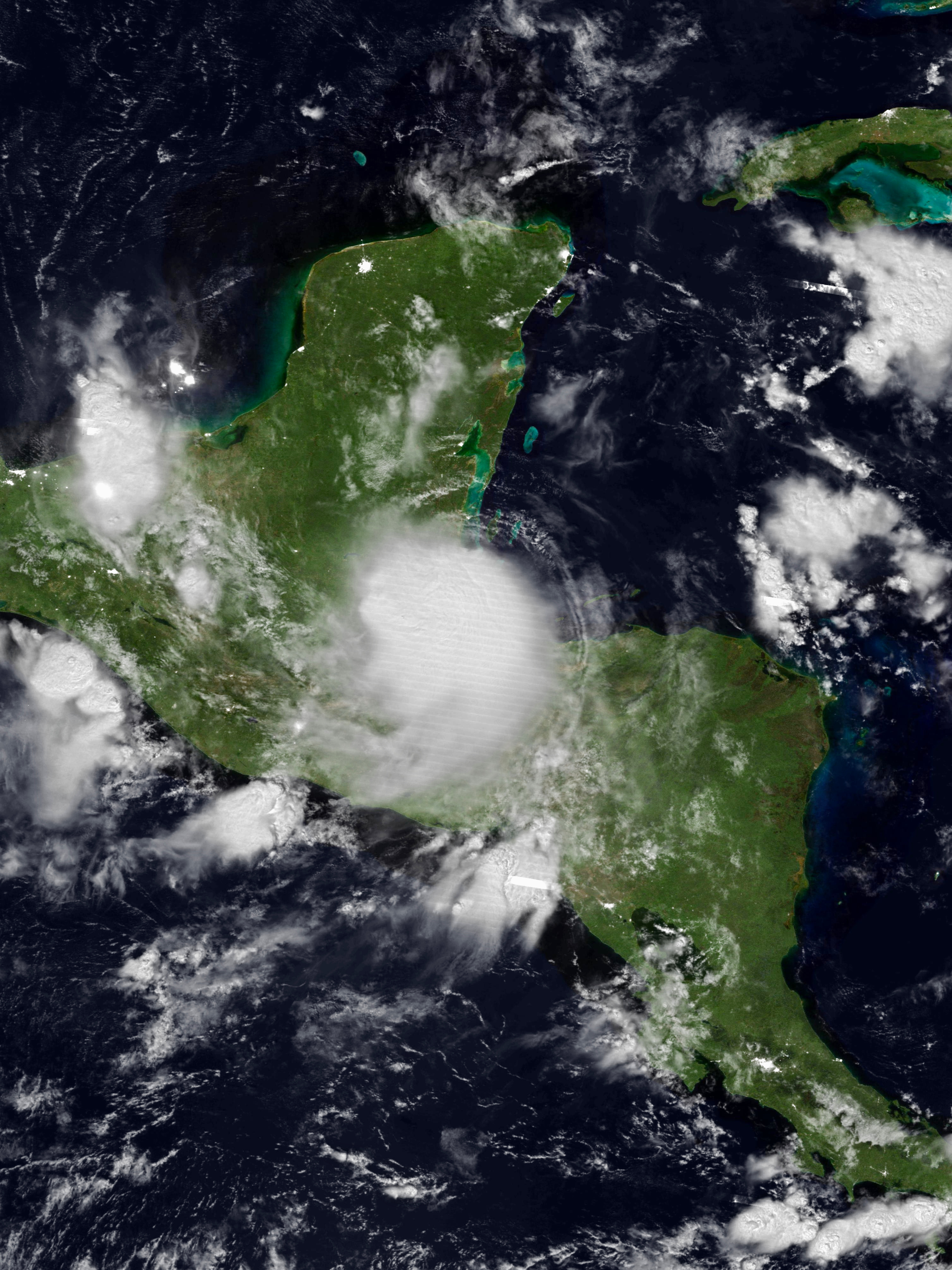
- Nana shortly after making landfall in Belize on September 3

Meteorological history
- Formed: September 1, 2020
- Remnant low: September 3, 2020
- Dissipated: September 4, 2020

Category 1 hurricane
- 1-minute sustained (SSHWS/NWS)
- Highest winds: 75 mph (120 km/h)
- Lowest pressure: 994 mbar (hPa); 29.35 inHg

Overall effects
- Fatalities: None
- Economic losses: ≥$20 million (2020 USD)
- Areas affected: Windward Islands, Jamaica, Cayman Islands, Honduras, Belize, Guatemala, Mexico
- IBTrACS
- Part of the 2020 Atlantic hurricane season

Hurricane Nana was a small, short-lived tropical cyclone that caused relatively minor damage in Belize and Mexico in early September 2020. The sixteenth tropical cyclone, fourteenth named storm, and fifth hurricane of the record-breaking 2020 Atlantic hurricane season, Nana originated from a tropical wave that moved off the coast of West Africa on August 23. The system progressed westward with little development for the next week before crossing into the Caribbean Sea. The wave gradually developed organized convection and a defined surface low on September 1, signifying the formation of Tropical Storm Nana as it approached Jamaica. Persistent wind shear stifled development of the storm, though following repeated bursts of deep convection, it intensified into a minimal hurricane on September 3. Nana attained peak winds of 75 mph (121 km/h) (Note: All winds are one-minute sustained unless otherwise noted.) and a minimum pressure of 994 mbar (994 hPa; 29.4 inHg) shortly before striking Belize. Once onshore, the hurricane rapidly degraded and its surface low dissipated over Guatemala on September 4. The mid-level remnants of Nana later reorganized over the Gulf of Tehuantepec and became Tropical Storm Julio.

Throughout the Caribbean, Nana produced gusty winds and heavy rainfall in several nations. Damage was largely limited to flooding and landslides, with the most significant effects being felt in Belize and Mexico. More than 2,500 homes were flooded or otherwise damaged between the two nations. Belize also experienced significant agricultural damage. Collectively, economic losses in Central America and Mexico exceeded US$20 million (Note: All monetary values are in 2020 values of their respective currencies unless otherwise noted.) as a result of the hurricane; however, no fatalities were reported.

== Meteorological history ==
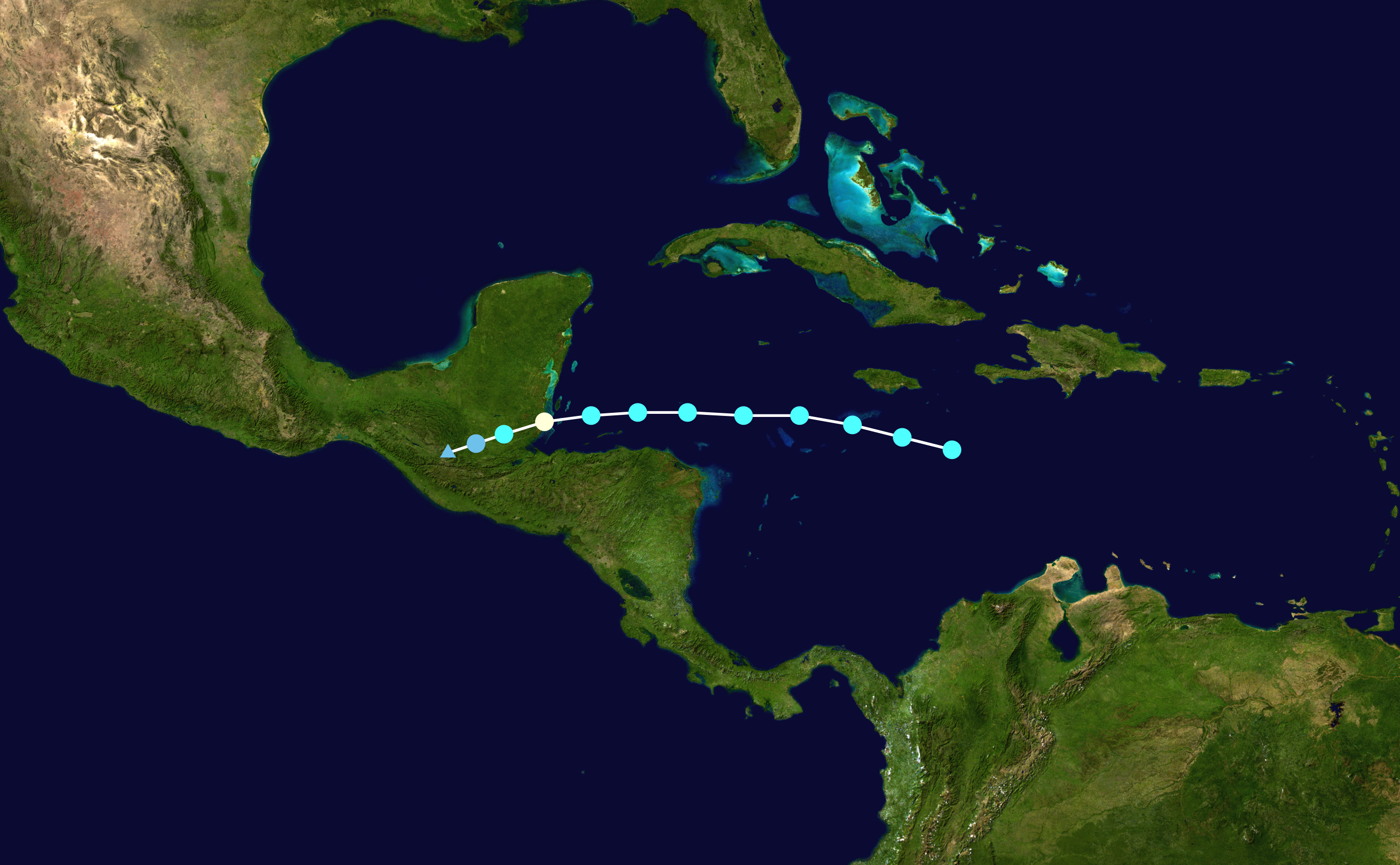
Map plotting the storm's track and intensity, according to the Saffir–Simpson scale Map key Saffir–Simpson scale Tropical depression (≤38 mph, ≤62 km/h) Tropical storm (39–73 mph, 63–118 km/h) Category 1 (74–95 mph, 119–153 km/h) Category 2 (96–110 mph, 154–177 km/h) Category 3 (111–129 mph, 178–208 km/h) Category 4 (130–156 mph, 209–251 km/h) Category 5 (≥157 mph, ≥252 km/h) Unknown Storm type Tropical cyclone Subtropical cyclone Extratropical cyclone, remnant low, tropical disturbance, or monsoon depression

On August 23, 2020, the National Hurricane Center (NHC) identified a westward-moving tropical wave over West Africa. A broad area of disorganized convection, primarily east of the wave axis, accompanied the system as it emerged over the Atlantic Ocean early the next day. Convection increased by August 27 as the wave traversed the central Atlantic, and the NHC noted the possibility of gradual tropical cyclogenesis over the following days. Little development occurred over the next few days as it approached the Windward Islands. Upon entering the Caribbean Sea on August 30, the system started to organize with evidence of a broad surface low apparent on satellite-derived observations. Convection gradually increased as the system continued west across the Caribbean and appeared well-organized on satellite imagery. Scatterometer data and ship observations revealed tropical storm-force winds south of Haiti and southeast of Jamaica early on September 1 and post-storm analysis indicated the system developed into Tropical Storm Nana at 06:00 UTC. At the time, Nana was situated 180 mi (290 km) southeast of Kingston, Jamaica. This marked the earliest formation of a season's fourteenth named storm, surpassing the previous record set by Hurricane Nate on September 6, 2005. Operationally, the NHC did not name the system at that point because it was unclear whether it had a well-defined low-level-circulation. However, with the storm posing an imminent threat to Central America, the NHC initiated advisories on the system as Potential Tropical Cyclone Sixteen at 15:00 UTC. It was not warned on as a tropical storm until 17:00 UTC when aircraft reconnaissance confirmed a well-defined low with winds of 70 mph (110 km/h) aloft with estimated surface winds of 50 mph (80 km/h). With a defined anticyclone aloft providing ample outflow, high sea surface temperatures, and low to moderate wind shear, steady intensification was expected.

A small cyclone with tropical storm-force winds extending no more than 70 mi (110 km) from the center, Nana progressed along a generally westward trajectory in response to a subtropical ridge to the north. Persistent moderate wind shear and intrusions of dry air inhibited significant development of the system as it passed 155 mi (249 km) south of the Cayman Islands. Early on September 2, a burst of deep convection with cloud tops as cold as −80 °C (−112 °F) developed over the storm's center and microwave satellite imagery revealed the formation of an eye-like feature. Furthermore, rainbands organized along the southwestern periphery of Nana. Wind shear briefly disrupted this development, with Nana's surface center displaced to the northeastern edge of the convective mass, before abating later that day. The ridge over the Gulf of Mexico reoriented along a west-southwest to east-northeast axis, causing Nana to turn to the west-southwest. Another convective burst early on September 3 led to the storm intensifying to a Category 1 hurricane by 03:00 UTC. Nana reached its peak intensity at this time with maximum winds of 75 mph (121 km/h) and a minimum pressure of 994 mbar (994 hPa; 29.4 inHg). Just three hours later, the hurricane made landfall near Sittee Point, Belize—about 50 mi (80 km) south of Belize City. Nana was the first hurricane to hit the country since Hurricane Earl in August 2016. Rapid weakening ensued as the cyclone moved inland over mountainous terrain and into Guatemala. Nana degraded to a tropical depression by 18:00 UTC, as it approached the Guatemala–Mexico border, before degenerating into a remnant low by 00:00 UTC. The system's surface low dissipated soon thereafter, as it approached the southwestern coast of Guatemala.

The mid-level remnant of Nana then entered the Gulf of Tehuantepec and redeveloped a small surface low by 12:00 UTC on September 4. Global weather models indicated conditions in the region were unfavorable for tropical cyclone development, and accordingly, the NHC did not expect Nana to redevelop. Organized convection re-fired over the system and it regenerated into a tropical storm around 00:00 UTC on September 5. Since the low-level circulation of Nana dissipated during its crossing of Central America and was thus considered dissipated by the NHC, the reborn system was classified as Tropical Storm Julio. This new storm moved at an unusually-brisk pace to the west-northwest, attaining peak winds of 45 mph (72 km/h) on September 6. Hostile conditions caused the small system to weaken to a tropical depression a day later, and a remnant low soon thereafter. Julio ultimately dissipated early on September 7 to the southwest of Socorro Island.

== Preparations and impact ==
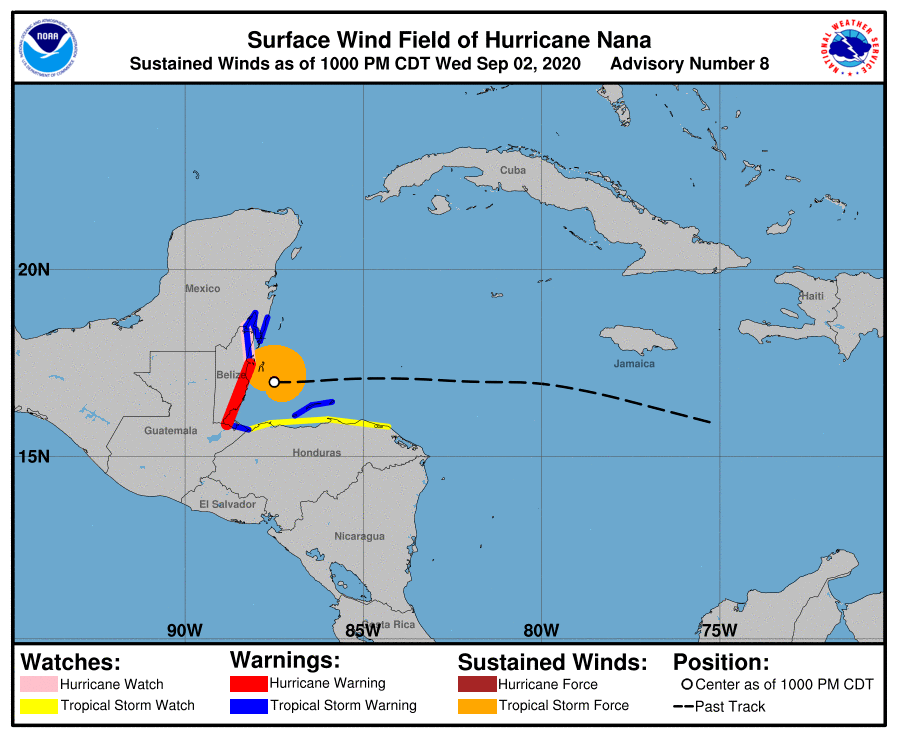
Watches and warnings associated with Hurricane Nana reached their maximum extent early on September 3, covering areas from Costa Maya, Mexico, south to the Belize/Guatemala border and east to Punta Patuca, Honduras.

Multiple tropical storm watches and warnings were issued ahead of Nana for parts of Belize, Guatemala, Honduras, and Mexico between September 1 and 3. On September 2, hurricane warnings were issued in Belize between Belize City and the Guatemala border. All of these advisories were discontinued within nine hours of Hurricane Nana's landfall on September 3. According to AON Benfield, total economic losses across Belize, Guatemala, Honduras, and southeastern Mexico exceeded US$20 million.

=== Windward Islands ===
Between August 29–30, the Barbados Met Office and Dominica Meteorological Service issued flash flood watches for their respective nations in anticipation of moderate to heavy rains from the precursor wave. Météo-France alerted residents in Martinique of possible heavy rain and strong winds from the tropical wave on August 30–31. The associated showers and thunderstorms produced up to 4.3 in (110 mm) of rain in Grand'Rivière and wind gusts to 52 mph (84 km/h) in Fonds-Saint-Denis. Approximately 5,600 customers lost power in Le François, Vert-Pré, La Trinité, Tartane, and L'Ajoupa-Bouillon. EDF deployed power crews soon after the storm's passage. Southern areas of Guadeloupe saw heavy rainfall; Goyave recorded a 12-hour accumulation of 3.8 in (96 mm). Nearby Îles des Saintes recorded 3.1 in (80 mm). In St. Lucia, increased turbidity and clogging due to heavy rain forced the temporary closure of the Theobalds Treatment Plant, which cut the water supply to residents in northern parts of the country.

=== Belize ===
In preparation for Nana, residents of Belize packed hardware and grocery stores, despite the ongoing COVID-19 pandemic. A total of 4,085 people evacuated nationwide to shelters provided by the government. The majority of evacuations were in southern districts, with 2,079 in Toledo and 980 in Stann Creek. A collision between a pickup truck and container truck near Belize City may have been related to the hurricane, with residents rushing to prepare for the storm.

Hurricane Nana made landfall in a sparsely populated area of Belize. Rainfall associated with its passage was heaviest to the south of the hurricane's center due to its lopsided structure. Accumulations reached 3 to 5 in (76 to 127 mm) in the Toledo District, with a peak of 5.7 in (144 mm) in Corazon. The strongest winds were recorded on the offshore Carrie Bow Cay, with sustained values reaching 61 mph (98 km/h) and a gust of 75 mph (121 km/h). Belize City saw peak winds of 47 mph (76 km/h) and just 0.69 in (18 mm) of rain. There were no known observations of storm surge or accompanying damage according to the National Meteorological Service of Belize. Large swells did cause minor damage to piers in Placencia. A waterspout was observed offshore after Nana's landfall. Wind damage was confined to a very small area of the Stann Creek District surrounding Nana's landfall point. Structural damage occurred in Georgetown, Hopkins, Independence, Silk Grass, and Sittee River. Residences across Dangriga, Hopkins, and Placencia lost power. A total of 24 homes were damaged by the storm: 13 in Silk Grass, 7 in Hopkins, and 4 in Dangriga. More than 960 acres (390 hectares) of banana and plantain crops worth BZ$20.5 million (US$10 million) were destroyed. The nation's citrus industry escaped significant losses.

The Government of Belize quickly distributed aid to the hardest-hit areas. The National Emergency Management Organization conducted damage surveys while the Ministry of Humanitarian Development coordinated relief efforts. Total aid, including zinc, zinc plywood, and foodstuffs, was valued at BZ$8–10 million (US$4–5 million).

=== Elsewhere ===
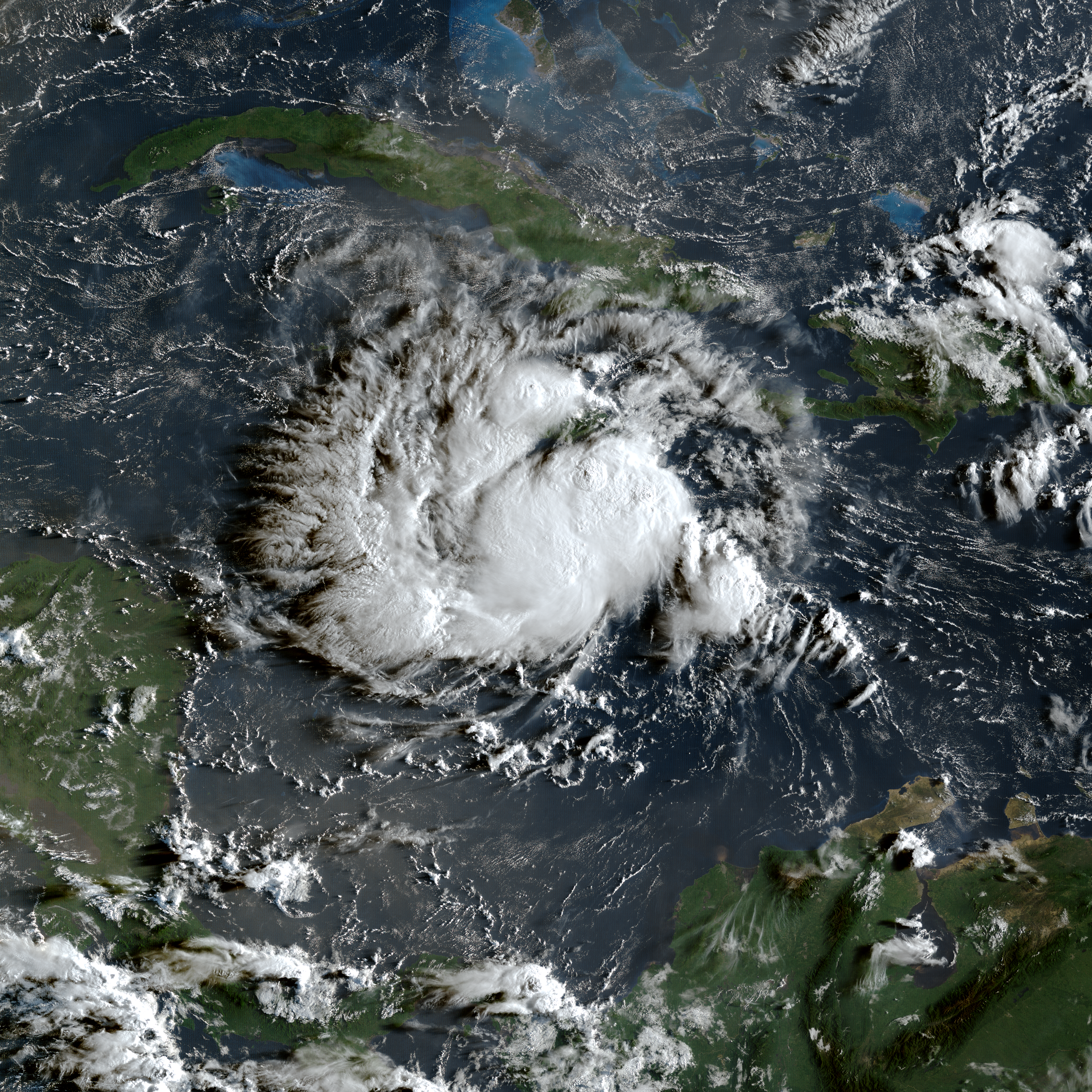
Tropical Storm Nana at 12:00 UTC on September 1 as it bypassed Jamaica to the south

In Honduras, rainfall alerts were issued for 11 of the nation's 18 departments. Six departments reported varying types of damage, including fallen trees, flooding, landslides, mudslides, and damaged roofs. In the La Paz Department, landslides and mudslides damaged several kilometers of roads, particularly in the Cabañas and Santa Ana municipalities. Flooding in the Comayagua Department undermined rural roads, primarily in agricultural areas. Flash floods stranded cars in Tegucigalpa. Flooding also occurred in the Bay Islands and Gracias a Dios departments. Strong winds and rough seas prompted evacuations in Roatán. A lightning strike in the El Corpus municipality damaged a church bell tower. Several farms suffered crop losses in the municipality. There were no reports of tropical storm-force winds throughout the affected areas.

In Jamaica, Nana's rainfall caused some flooding in parts of the southern part of the country. In the Cayman Islands, Nana's rainfall caused some minor flooding in some low-lying areas on Grand Cayman. Guatemala's National Coordinator for Disaster Reduction (Conred) alerted residents to potential flash floods, damaging winds, and power and water supply interruptions. Authorities emphasized that the region was vulnerable to floods due to soil saturation from the annual rainy season and the prolific rains from tropical storms Amanda and Cristobal in May and June earlier that year. However, no evacuations took place. Heavy rains affected the country on September 3–4, especially along its border with Mexico near the Pacific coast. Accumulations reached 5 to 7 in (130 to 180 mm) in this region, with a peak of 7.2 in (183 mm) in Trinidad. A bridge collapsed in the Alta Verapaz Department, affecting 500 people. Fallen trees blocked some roads and highways in the Izabal Department. A tree fell on a home in Finca Salinas de Amatitlán, injuring one person inside. Throughout the nation, a total of 18,865 people were directly affected though overall damage was not major. A "preventative alert" was issued in El Salvador.

In Mexico, the primary impact from Nana was heavy rainfall across parts of Campeche, Chiapas, Oaxaca, Tabasco, and Veracruz. A swath of up to 8 in (200 mm) was forecast along Nana's path in Eastern Mexico. Heavy rain in Veracruz led to flash floods, primarily across the Papaloapan River basin. The Tesechoacan River, a tributary of the Papaloapan, overflowed its banks. Floodwaters reached a depth of 3.3 ft (1 m) in several areas, leaving 14 communities temporarily isolated in the José Azueta and Isla municipalities. Nineteen municipalities reported damage, with 2,446 homes flooded and 9,800 people affected. A total of 397 homes were flooded in Tlacojalpan, and municipal authorities opened two shelters to house displaced residents. Both Acula and Tres Valles reported at least 100 damaged structures. Two bridges were damaged along the swollen La Palma stream in the Playa Vicente municipality. The Secretariat of National Defense distributed bilge pumps to several of the affected communities. Officials in Oaxaca opened two shelters, housing 60 families, and members of the Mexican Army were deployed in the Tuxtepec District. Flooding occurred along the Blanco and Colorado rivers. At least 54 homes were damaged across the state, with the most affected areas being along the border with Veracruz.

== See also ==
- Tropical cyclones in 2020
- Other storms of the same name
- List of Atlantic–Pacific crossover hurricanes
- List of Category 1 Atlantic hurricanes
- Hurricane Keith (2000) – devastating Category 4 hurricane that stalled just offshore Belize before making landfall as a minimal hurricane
- Hurricane Iris (2001) – a small, but devastating Category 4 hurricane that took an almost identical track
- Hurricane Richard (2010) – struck Belize as a Category 2 hurricane
- Tropical Storm Harvey (2011) – took a similar track to Nana
- Hurricane Earl (2016) – took a similar track to Nana
- Hurricane Lisa (2022) – had a very similar track
