= List of storms named Nana =

The name Nana has been used for three tropical cyclones in the Atlantic Ocean:

- Hurricane Nana (1990) – a Category 1 hurricane that affected Bermuda.
- Tropical Storm Nana (2008) – did not affect land.
- Hurricane Nana (2020) – a Category 1 hurricane that made landfall in Belize. Also the earliest 14th named storm of an Atlantic hurricane season on record.

== See also ==
Storms with similar names

- Cyclone Nanauk (2014) – a North Indian Ocean cyclonic storm.
- Cyclone Nano (1983) – a Category 3 South Pacific Ocean severe tropical cyclone.
- Tropical Storm Narra (2026) – a West Pacific Ocean tropical storm.
