= Old Bethel United Methodist Church =

Historic church in South Carolina, United States

- Bethel United Methodist Church
- U.S. National Register of Historic Places
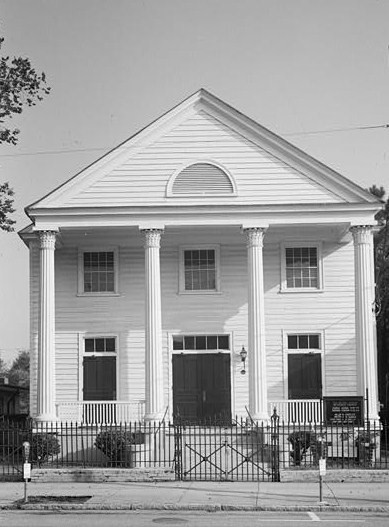
- This is Old Bethel United Methodist Church, built about 1797-1798, and moved to Calhoun Street in 1880.

- Location within South Carolina Location within the United States
- Location: 222 Calhoun St., Charleston, South Carolina
- Coordinates: 32°47′4″N 79°56′31″W
- Area: less than one acre
- Built: c. 1797-1798
- Architectural style: meetinghouse plan; portico added in 1880s
- NRHP reference No.: 75001693
- Added to NRHP: April 21, 1975

Old Bethel United Methodist Church is located at 222 Calhoun Street, Charleston, South Carolina. It is the oldest Methodist church still standing in the city.

Originally built about 1797/1798 for the Bethel Methodist congregation, after 1854 this structure was moved from its first place on the site and reserved for its black members. The white members took control of the new church completed that year on the site. In 1882 officials of Bethel Methodist gave this wooden church building to the black church members; they moved it across to the north side of Calhoun Street (earlier known as Boundary Street) in April 1882.

Both churches were listed separately on the National Register of Historic Places in 1975.

== History ==
This building was originally built at 55 Pitt St. at the corner of Calhoun Street (then called Boundary Street) in 1797-1798 for the Bethel Methodist Church, a white-dominated congregation. It was a plan meeting house with a simple rectangular plan. Black members were restricted to sitting in the galleries, although the Methodists accepted both free and enslaved blacks as members and licensed some as preachers. They were sometimes allowed to have separate worship services at times alternate to the white congregation.

In 1818 some blacks withdrew from the congregation, affiliating with Rev. Morris Brown and the Hampstead Church (later known as Emanuel AME Church), established about that time in Charleston after a dispute with whites at Bethel. It was built on the north side of Calhoun Street. They had protested a structure being placed on the black burial ground at the Bethel Methodist plot. Emanuel AME Church was suppressed in 1822 following the uprising planned by Denmark Vesey, a leader in that church, after he and others were arrested, convicted, and executions. Brown was imprisoned for about a year, although he was never convicted of a crime.

In 1834 some blacks at Bethel Methodist protested being limited to sitting in the galleries. When nine members were expelled, 165 left the church in protest. A nineteenth-century minister and church historian described these events as "the heaviest blow Methodism ever received in Charleston."

== New church ==
With growth, the congregation of Bethel Methodist commissioned a new Greek Revival building, which was completed in 1854. Before that construction, they moved this older wooden building to the back of their lot. It was reserved for use by black members who remained affiliated with this church. The new church was used exclusively by whites.

== Old Bethel Methodist Church ==
After the Civil War, this black congregation was led for a period by Henry Cardozo, a pastor who later became a politician. One of his brothers was Francis Lewis Cardozo, who was elected as Secretary of State of South Carolina during the Reconstruction era. Henry Cardozo also served in political office, first as County Auditor of Charleston County. Later he was elected as a Republican state senator from Kershaw County, South Carolina, serving 1870 to 1874.

Following the Reconstruction era, in April 1882 the white congregation formally transferred this wooden building to the black congregation. They moved it across the corner to Calhoun Street, giving it a new address, and renamed it as Old Bethel Methodist Church. Because of prohibitions against blacks having churches south of what was then called Boundary Street, they placed it on the north side of Calhoun Street.

After the structure was relocated, the congregation had a portico added, supported by four fluted columns. The columns have modified Corinthian-type capitals. The galleried interior is plainly finished.

Following the 1968 unification of the Methodist Church and the Evangelical United Brethren at a national meeting in Dallas, Texas, this church was renamed as Old Bethel United Methodist Church. The church was renovated in the 1970s. In the 21st century it continues to be us by a congregation of about 200 persons.

Both this building and the 1854 Bethel Methodist Church were added to the National Register of Historic Places in 1975.
