= Denmark Vesey Monument =

Monument in Charleston, South Carolina, United States

- Interactive map of Denmark Vesey Monument
- Location: Hampton Park, Charleston, South Carolina, United States
- Coordinates: 32°48′01″N 79°57′18″W
- Designer: Ed Dwight
- Material: Bronze; Granite
- Height: 7 feet (2.1 m) (statue)
- Dedicated date: February 15, 2014
- Dedicated to: Denmark Vesey

The Denmark Vesey Monument is a monumental statue in Charleston, South Carolina, United States. The monument was erected in 2014 in Hampton Park and honors Denmark Vesey, a freedman who lived in Charleston and was executed in 1822 for plotting a slave revolt. It was designed by American sculptor Ed Dwight.

== History ==
=== Background ===
Denmark Vesey was a freedman who lived in Charleston, South Carolina during the early 1800s. A former slave, Vesey had bought his freedom in 1799 and became a carpenter. He was literate and an active member in a local church congregation, Emanuel African Methodist Episcopal Church (Emanuel AME). In the late 1810s, having studied the Bible and in particular the Book of Exodus, Vesey became inspired to organize a slave revolt in Charleston. Working with another carpenter, and with the support of church members, Vesey planned to lead approximately 9,000 slaves in the area in an uprising against the white Americans in the city that would have seen many of them killed and the city burned down. Vesey then planned to sail with these freed slaves to Haiti, with Vesey having reached out to officials in that country to gain their support. However, the plan fell apart when a slave reported the plot to his owner. Vesey and several co-conspirators were arrested in summer 1822, and five days later, he was found guilty and sentenced to death. Vesey was executed on July 2, days before the planned day of the uprising on July 14.

=== Controversy over the monument ===
Efforts towards erecting a monument honoring Vesey began in the 1990s, with African American activists in the city wanting to erect a monument that would draw more attention to the role that slavery played in the city's history. In 1996, a committee was formed by a city councilmember and a member of the Avery Research Center for African American History and Culture for the purposes of creating the monument. However, the project was considered controversial given Vesey's reputation. A 2010 article in the Charleston City Paper called Vesey a "terrorist" and compared his plans to kill civilians in the city to terrorist activities by Osama bin Laden. An op-ed published in The New York Times in 2014 discussed the controversy, with the author claiming "There's no doubt that Vesey was a violent man, who planned to attack and kill Charleston whites. But those who condemn him as a terrorist merely demonstrate how little we, as a culture, understand about slavery, and what it forced the men and women it ensnared to do."

A 2015 article in Yahoo! News also discussed the controversy surrounding the monument in relation to the controversy surrounding other monuments in the city, including the John C. Calhoun Monument and the Confederate Defenders of Charleston monument. A 2011 article in Bernews pointed out that the location for the monument, Hampton Park, was far from the city's historic district and would probably not be seen by many tourists. This was also discussed in a 2015 article in The New York Times, which said the monument's erection came only after advocates agreed not to place the monument across from the Calhoun monument, but instead "in a park on the edge of Charleston.

Around 2001, (Note: A 2011 article in Bernews states "Nearly ten years ago, when the Charleston City Council first appropriated funds to erect a statue of Mr Vesey...") the Charleston City Council appropriated funds towards the monument's construction. This elicited further responses from individuals concerned with the monument's subject, with many letters to newspapers criticizing Vesey and calling him "a mass murderer" and an "advocate of ethnic cleansing".

=== Erection and dedication ===
The groundbreaking for the monument was held in February 2010. Colorado-based sculptor Ed Dwight was selected to design the monument, which consisted of a statue of Vesey atop a large pedestal. The monument was dedicated on February 15, 2014 in a ceremony that was attended by several hundred people. At the ceremony, Charleston Mayor Joseph P. Riley Jr. said “The undeniable fact is this: Denmark Vesey was free. He was a free black man, no one owned him … He risked his life and gave his life to make enslaved people free.” The reverend of Emanuel AME, who spoke at the event, said, "My hope is that this monument will add to the full story of our southern heritage.”

In 2017, the monument was damaged in what may have been an act of vandalism.

== Design ==
The monument consists of a 7-foot (2.1 m) bronze statue of Vesey atop a large granite pedestal. Vesey is holding a bag of carpentry tools in one hand and a Bible in the other. Vesey is facing towards a gazebo in the park.

== See also ==
- 2014 in art
