= Richard Brenan House =

House

Coordinates: 32.784305°N 79.940472°W

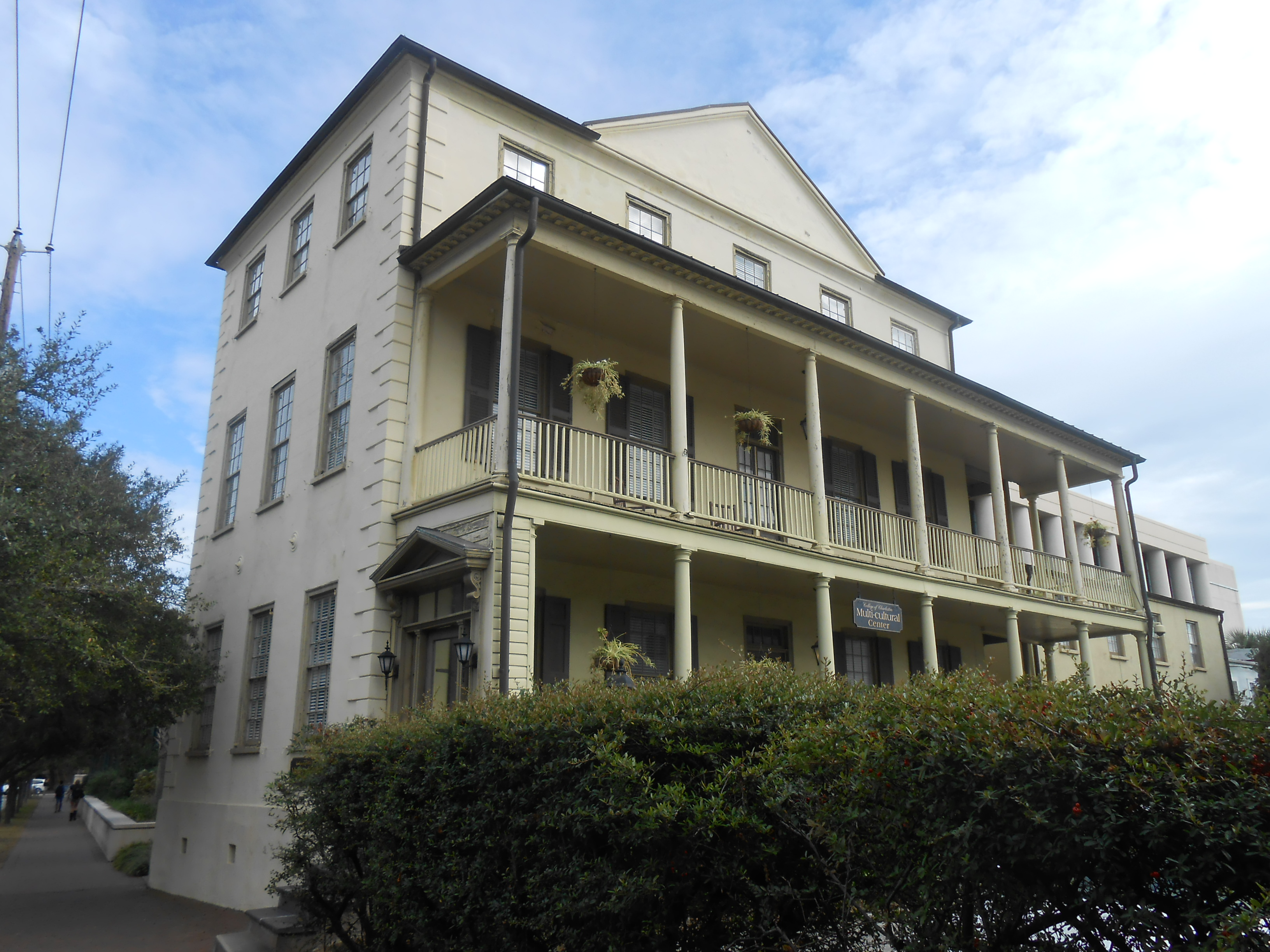
The Richard Brenan House, 207 Calhoun St., Charleston, South Carolina

The Richard Brenan House is an early 19th-century house at 207 Calhoun St., Charleston, South Carolina. The house was built for Richard Brenan, a merchant, in 1817 and originally included the adjacent land to the west (a parking lot today). The house is a three-story Charleston single house with quoins and fine cornice. The house was a two-story piazza on the west side.

In 1835, the house was bought by Nathaniel Russell Middleton, a president of the College of Charleston, for his widowed sister-in-law. In 1881, the house became the parsonage for Bethel Methodist located across Pitt St. from the house. The church put the house up for sale in 1965. It was restored as a private house by Mr. and Mrs. G.A.Z. Johnson.
