= Sharon Risher =

Sharon Washington Risher is an American Christian minister and anti-gun violence activist. She gained attention after the 2015 attack upon the Emanuel African Methodist Episcopal Church in Charleston, South Carolina, killed her mother and two cousins. Risher has since advocated for gun safety and repeal of the federal death penalty, and spoken for the Everytown Survivor Network and Moms Demand Action for Gun Sense in America.

== Early life and education ==
Sharon Risher grew up in Charleston with her parents, Nathaniel Nathan Lance and Ethel Lance, and four of her siblings, Terrie, Gary, Esther, and Nadine. She attended public schools in Charleston and then graduated from Johnson C. Smith University and Austin Presbyterian Theological Seminary in 2007.

== Career ==
Risher was a trauma specialist and staff chaplain at Parkland Memorial Hospital in Dallas, Texas, and was associate pastor for congregational care at Rice Chapel AME Church in Dallas. She also led the women's ministries until 2015. As a trauma specialist, she works with other United States mass shooting survivors.

== Tragedy and activism ==
On June 17, 2015, Dylann Roof opened fire at Mother Emanuel African Methodist Episcopal Church in Charleston, killing nine people, including Risher's mother, two cousins, and a childhood friend, Myra Singleton. Risher was assisting Rice Chapel AME church when she had received multiple missed calls from her daughter while working. This was deemed one of America's deadliest in modern history. Since then, Risher has advocated for changing gun laws. RIsher calls herself an "accidental activist" since the shooting made her realize something worth fighting for. She is a spokesperson for Everytown Survivor Network and Moms Demand Action for Gun Sense in America and released a book called For Such Time As This Hope and Forgiveness after Charleston Massacre. She has also met with surviving mass shooting victims, such as those who attended Sandy Hook Elementary School in Newtown, Connecticut and Stoneman Douglas High School in Parkland, Florida. She has appeared on numerous media outlets, such as CNN and Good Morning America, as well as being interviewed by print outlets like Time and Vogue. Risher has spoke at many Martin Luther King Jr. events and testified on the bill about expanding the 3 day waiting period to buy a gun. She witnessed President Barack Obama sign executive orders related to new gun regulations and laws.

After Roof was sentenced to death in 2017, Risher became involved in the Death Penalty Action Organization, calling an end to the federal death penalty. Risher signed a letter asking North Carolina Governor Roy Cooper to commute death sentences.

Risher was one of 12 people recognized by the South Carolina Department of Education in South Carolina's 2025 African American History Calendar.

== Personal life ==
Risher now resides in Charlotte, North Carolina, with her two grown children, Howard Brandon and Aja’ Sharnee’ and grandchildren. She also has a two dogs, Milo and Lee and has many hobbies.
