= Hurricane Epsilon (2020) =

Category 3 Atlantic hurricane

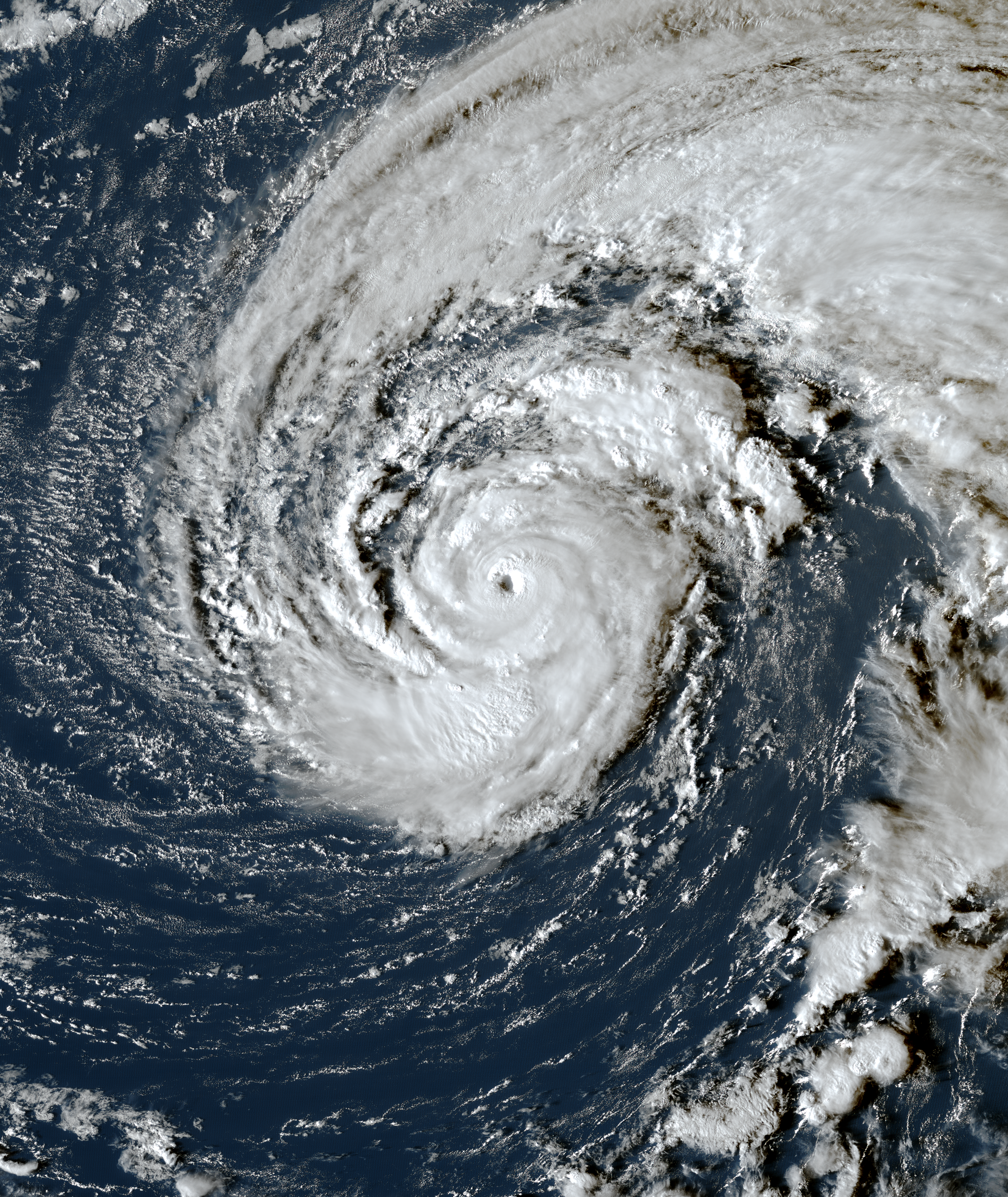
- Epsilon nearing peak intensity, late on October 21

Meteorological history
- Formed: October 19, 2020
- Dissipated: October 26, 2020

Category 3 major hurricane
- 1-minute sustained (SSHWS/NWS)
- Highest winds: 115 mph (185 km/h)
- Lowest pressure: 952 mbar (hPa); 28.11 inHg

Overall effects
- Fatalities: 1 direct
- Damage: Minimal
- Areas affected: East Coast of the United States; Lucayan Archipelago; Greater Antilles; Lesser Antilles; Bermuda; Atlantic Canada; British Isles; Iceland; Portugal
- IBTrACS
- Part of the 2020 Atlantic hurricane season

Hurricane Epsilon was a strong tropical cyclone that affected Bermuda, and parts of North America and Western Europe. The twenty-seventh tropical or subtropical cyclone, twenty-sixth named storm, eleventh hurricane, and fourth major hurricane of the extremely-active 2020 Atlantic hurricane season, (Note: A major hurricane is one that ranks at Category 3 or higher on the Saffir–Simpson scale.) Epsilon had a non-tropical origin, developing from an upper-level low off the East Coast of the United States on October 13. The low gradually organized, becoming Tropical Depression Twenty-Seven on October 19, and six hours later, Tropical Storm Epsilon. The storm executed a counterclockwise loop before turning westward, while strengthening. On October 20, Epsilon began undergoing rapid intensification, becoming a Category 1 hurricane on the next day, before peaking as a Category 3 major hurricane on October 22, with maximum 1-minute sustained winds of 115 mph (185 km/h) (Note: All winds are one-minute sustained unless otherwise noted.) and a minimum central pressure of 952 millibars (28.1 inHg). This made Epsilon the easternmost major hurricane this late in the calendar year, as well as the strongest late-season major hurricane in the northeastern Atlantic, and the fastest recorded case of a tropical cyclone undergoing rapid intensification that far northeast that late in the hurricane season. Afterward, Epsilon began to weaken as the system turned northward, with the storm dropping to Category 1 intensity late that day. Epsilon maintained its intensity as it moved northward, passing to the east of Bermuda. On October 24, Epsilon turned northeastward and gradually accelerated, before weakening into a tropical storm on the next day. On October 26, Epsilon transitioned into an extratropical cyclone, before being absorbed by another larger extratropical storm later that same day.

Epsilon brought tropical storm conditions to Bermuda while passing to the east of the island. The storm brought large surf to parts of the Caribbean and the East Coast of the United States. Epsilon's remnants later brought severe weather to the British Isles. The storm's remnants also produced one of the largest October swells on record in Nazaré, along the Atlantic coast of Portugal. Epsilon caused one death in Florida, when a 27-year-old man drowned in rip currents produced by the hurricane. Overall damage from the storm was minor.

== Meteorological history ==
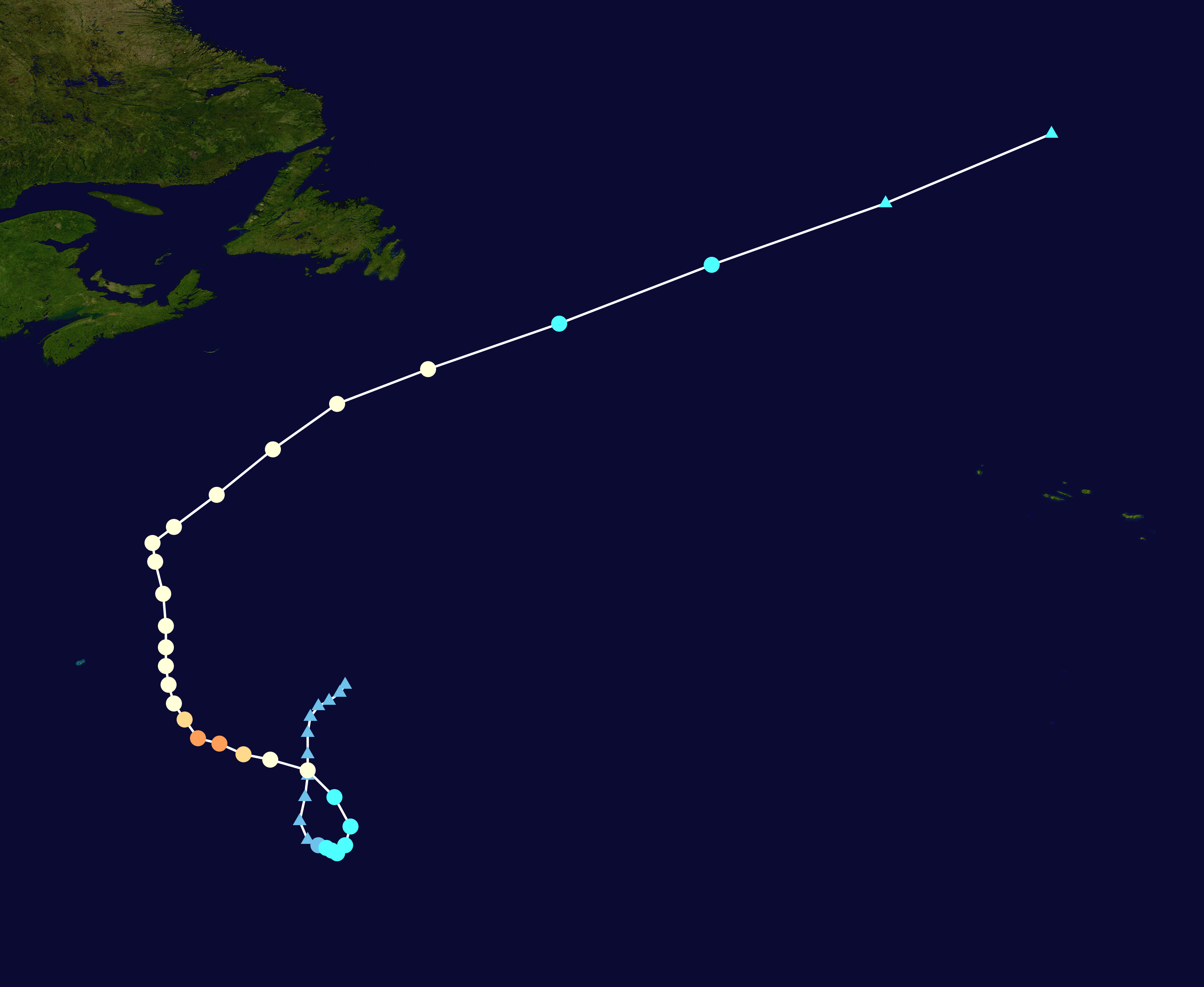
Map plotting the storm's track and intensity, according to the Saffir–Simpson scale Map key Saffir–Simpson scale Tropical depression (≤38 mph, ≤62 km/h) Tropical storm (39–73 mph, 63–118 km/h) Category 1 (74–95 mph, 119–153 km/h) Category 2 (96–110 mph, 154–177 km/h) Category 3 (111–129 mph, 178–208 km/h) Category 4 (130–156 mph, 209–251 km/h) Category 5 (≥157 mph, ≥252 km/h) Unknown Storm type Tropical cyclone Subtropical cyclone Extratropical cyclone, remnant low, tropical disturbance, or monsoon depression

Hurricane Epsilon had non-tropical origins, developing from an upper-level trough associated with a weak baroclinic low that emerged off the East Coast of the United States on October 13. As the primary low continued to drift towards the northeast, a trailing cold front behind the low moved eastward into the central Atlantic Ocean over the next few days; the low eventually stalled on October 15 and soon degenerated into a surface trough well east of Bermuda. Around this time, the National Hurricane Center (NHC) first noted the possibility of a broad non-tropical low-pressure system forming within the trough several days later, identifying a chance that the disturbance could gradually organize and undergo tropical cyclogenesis. Upstream synoptic flow began to increase, as an expansive upper-level ridge developed across the northwestern Atlantic, west of the original upper-level trough. This meteorological pattern caused the upper-level trough to be cut off, while bending underneath the ridge. On October 16, convective activity (or thunderstorms) began to increase and become better organized, as the cut-off low interacted with the degrading parent trough. With the low-level cyclonic flow strengthening, a non-tropical surface low formed underneath the cut-off upper-level low, at 12:00 UTC that same day.

Later that day, satellite wind data depicted a better-defined circulation, while convective activity continued to organize within the upper-level low. Over the next few days, the surface low continued to remain superimposed underneath the upper-level low, as it slowly wandered southward, equatorward of a deep-layer ridge resembling an omega block in the northern Atlantic. Only minimal convection was produced by the surface low, due to dry air associated with upper-level low prohibiting much convective activity. While moving southward, the disturbance encountered warmer sea surface temperatures of around 80 °F (27 °C), causing convection to flourish and deepen. However, the disturbance's center of circulation remained somewhat elongated. The convective activity began to degrade the dry cyclonic flow of the upper-level low, aiding the tropical transition of the system, as its wind field contracted and upper-level cyclonic flow intensified. At 06:00 UTC on October 19, a large burst of deep convection developed just east of the surface low, causing the center to become more sufficiently organized, prompting the NHC to upgrade the disturbance into Tropical Depression Twenty-Seven. The NHC also noted that the depression appeared more tropical than subtropical, due to its small radius of maximum sustained winds, despite undergoing a similar formation process to that of subtropical cyclones.

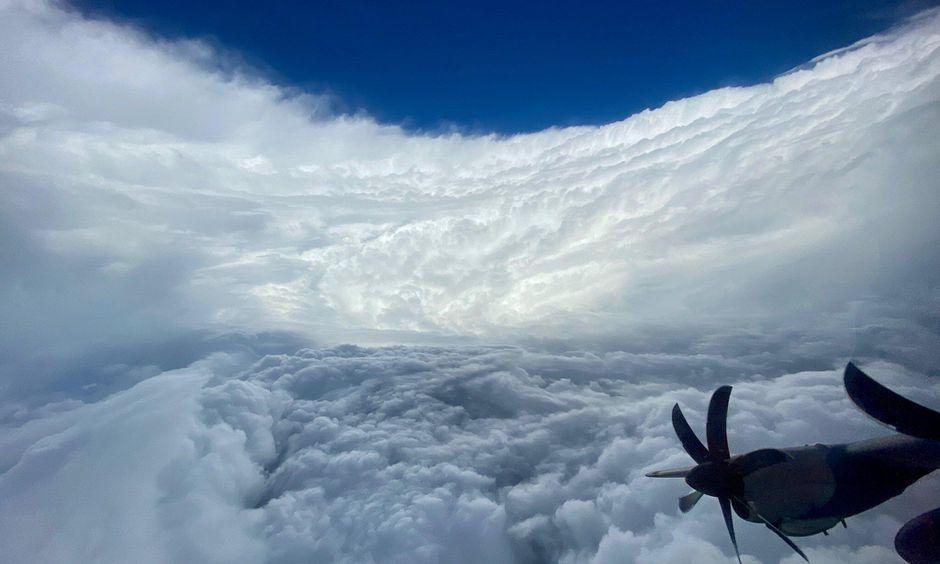
The Air Force Reserve Hurricane Hunters inside the stadium-effect eye of Hurricane Epsilon on October 21

Just six hours later, the depression strengthened into a tropical storm, and was given the name Epsilon. The name Epsilon comes from the Greek Alphabet backup naming lists for the NHC, which was only used for two seasons, the other being the 2005 season. Despite the center of the storm becoming exposed, convective banding over the northern and eastern parts of the system improved. This made the system take on the appearance of having a hybrid-type structure, resembling a subtropical cyclone in appearance. Situated within an area of moderate vertical wind shear and warm sea surface temperatures, further strengthening occurred. Later that same day, a new convective cluster near the center returned Epsilon to a more tropical appearance. However, ASCAT data depicted an asymmetrical wind radius, with gale-force winds extending northward 230 miles (370 km) from the center. Early on October 20, water vapor imagery showed Epsilon interacting with a dissipating cold front to its north and a negatively-titled (oriented northwest to southeast) upper-level trough from the south. Around this time, a dry slot formed within the eastern portion of the storm, weakening convective banding. The cloud pattern of Epsilon began to resemble an occluded extratropical low, with an inner-core tropical feature evident. The system began to move northward and then northwestward, making a loop over the Central Atlantic, due to its smaller circulation interacting with its upper-level cyclonic flow. Later that day, the system began to be affected by southwesterly vertical wind shear, due to the upper-level trough to its southwest, though it retained its hybrid-type structure. However, late that same day, wind shear calmed and dry air was mixed out of the cyclone, allowing the cyclone's structure to improve, with deep convection wrapping tightly around the center, as a small central dense overcast (CDO) became visible on satellite imagery. Even while battling weak-to-moderate deep-layer wind shear and some mid-level dry air, an eye-like feature started to become evident on visible and microwave imagery, giving Epsilon a more tropical structure, compared to its earlier hybrid appearance. Around this time, Epsilon underwent a period of rapid intensification, with sustained winds increasing by 50 mph (80 km/h) within a 24-hour period. At 03:00 UTC the next day, the NHC upgraded the strengthening tropical storm to a Category 1 hurricane, while it was located roughly 545 miles (877 km) east-southeast of Bermuda. However, the eastern and southern sides of the eyewall were rather thin, even as Epsilon shifted west-northwestward, due to a mid-tropospheric ridge located north of the cyclone. Despite this, just a few hours later, microwave imagery showed a closed eyewall with deep convection enclosing the center, with a 15 miles (24 km) eye visible. Around this time, Epsilon briefly shifted westward, before returning to its previous northwestward movement. At 18:00 UTC that same day, the Air Force Reserve Hurricane Hunters investigated the cyclone, finding flight-level and surface winds of around 110 mph (180 km/h), marking the storm's intensification into a high-end Category 2 hurricane. The reconnaissance aircraft also discovered a stadium-effect eye.

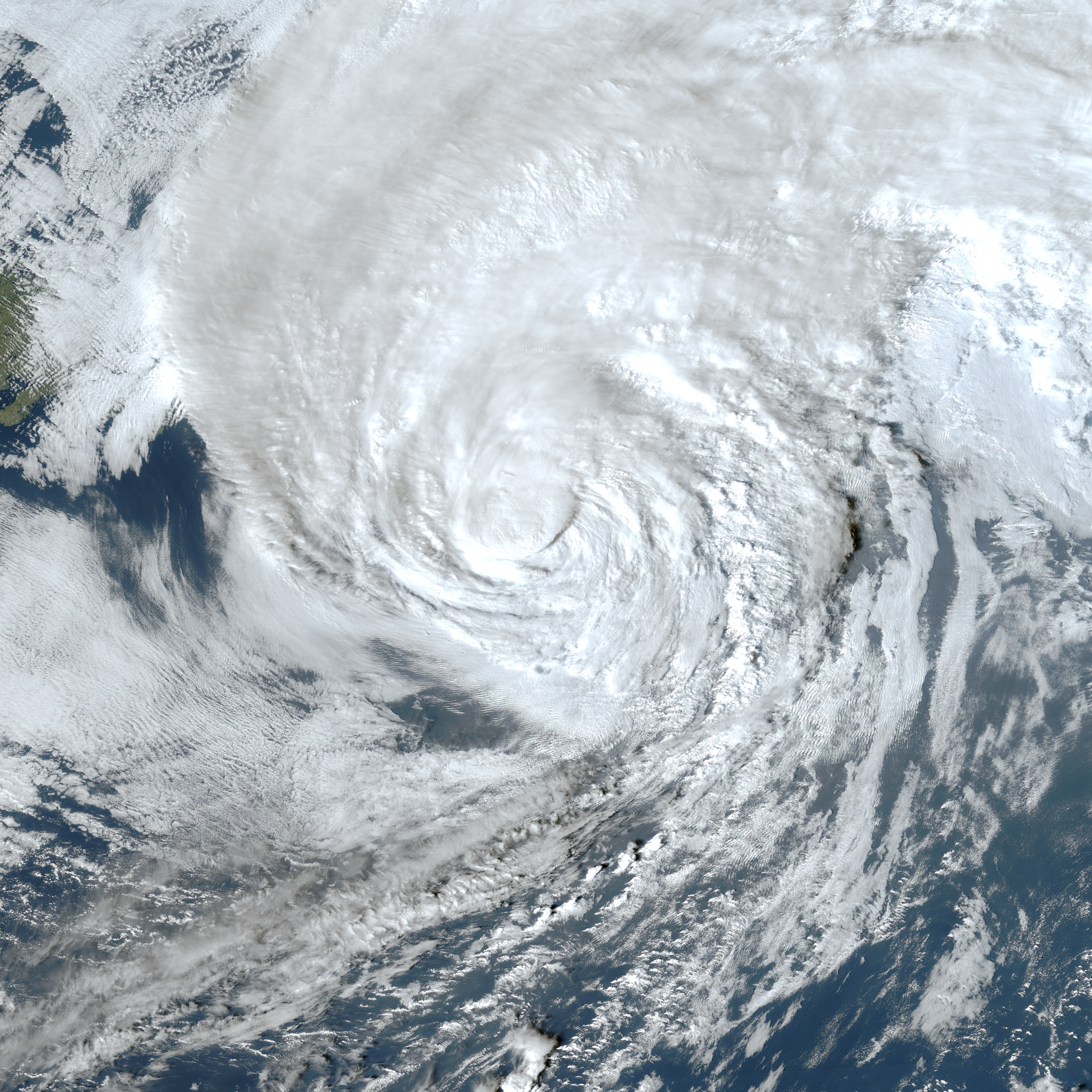
Epsilon as a weakening tropical storm south of Atlantic Canada on October 25

Just three hours later, Epsilon reached Category 3 major hurricane status, while displaying a well-organized satellite presentation. A warm, well-defined eye was evident, with closed eyewall convection, and cloud top temperatures of around −76 °F (−60 °C). The upgrade to a Category 3 hurricane made Epsilon the easternmost major hurricane recorded this late in the calendar year, as well as the strongest late-season major hurricane in the northeastern Atlantic, and the fastest rapid intensification rate of a tropical cyclone recorded this far northeast this late in the Atlantic hurricane season. At 00:00 UTC on October 22, Epsilon reached its peak intensity, with 1-minute sustained winds of around 115 mph (185 km/h) and a minimum central pressure of around 952 mbar (28.11 inHg). Meanwhile, the hurricane's small and well-defined inner core was located within an environment of deep-level moisture, protecting it from dry air associated with an upper-level trough wrapping three-quarters of the way around the hurricane. Shortly afterward, Epsilon began to degrade due to a dry air intrusion, and its eye started to become ill-defined and cloud-filled, while its western eyewall eroded, causing the storm to weaken to a Category 2 hurricane. Weakening ensued throughout the day, further degrading Epsilon to a 85 mph (135 km/h)-Category 1 hurricane before the weakening trend stopped, with the storm maintaining this intensity for about 48 hours. However, the eye briefly became better-defined, before becoming ill-defined once more just a few hours later. Meanwhile, the CDO became disorganized, with a broad outer band wrapping around the western portion of the storm. However, upper-level outflow was well-defined in the northern part of the hurricane. Around this time, Epsilon made its closest approach to Bermuda, passing just 190 miles (310 km) east of the island. At 15:00 UTC on October 23, a small eye reappeared on geostationary and polar-orbiting microwave imagery, along with increased well-defined curved banding. Concentric eyewalls began to develop within Epsilon, while the northern half of its wind field expanded, indicating the start of an eyewall replacement cycle. Several hours later, early on October 24, Epsilon completed its eyewall replacement cycle. The storm's convective pattern devolved into a large, comma-shaped structure, rather than the classical circular structure normally seen in mature tropical cyclones. During this time, Epsilon moved over the warm waters of the Gulf Stream, which allowed it to retain its intensity. A buoy near the center of the hurricane indicated that Epsilon's central pressure was about 957.8 millibars (28.28 inHg) around this time, which indicated that Epsilon was a stronger hurricane than the NHC had estimated it to be earlier.

Later that day, Epsilon began interacting with another upper-level trough; combined with baroclinic forcing, this caused Epsilon's wind field and inner core to expand in size. Epsilon also turned sharply northeastward and accelerated its forward motion. The hurricane slowly weakened as it continued moving further north. Early on October 25, Epsilon began transitioning into an extratropical cyclone, with the storm's cloud pattern expanding in size. The storm soon moved north of the Gulf Stream several hours later and entered much cooler waters, subsequently weakening into a tropical storm at about 18:00 UTC on the same day, even as it moved closer to another larger extratropical storm to the north, which was spawned by the upper-level trough. At 06:00 UTC on October 26, Epsilon finished transitioning into an extratropical cyclone while located about 565 miles (909 km) east of Cape Race, Newfoundland, with the storm's low-level circulation becoming stretched out along a north–south axis. Later that day, Epsilon was absorbed by the larger extratropical storm to the north, at 18:00 UTC.

== Preparations and impact ==
=== Bermuda ===
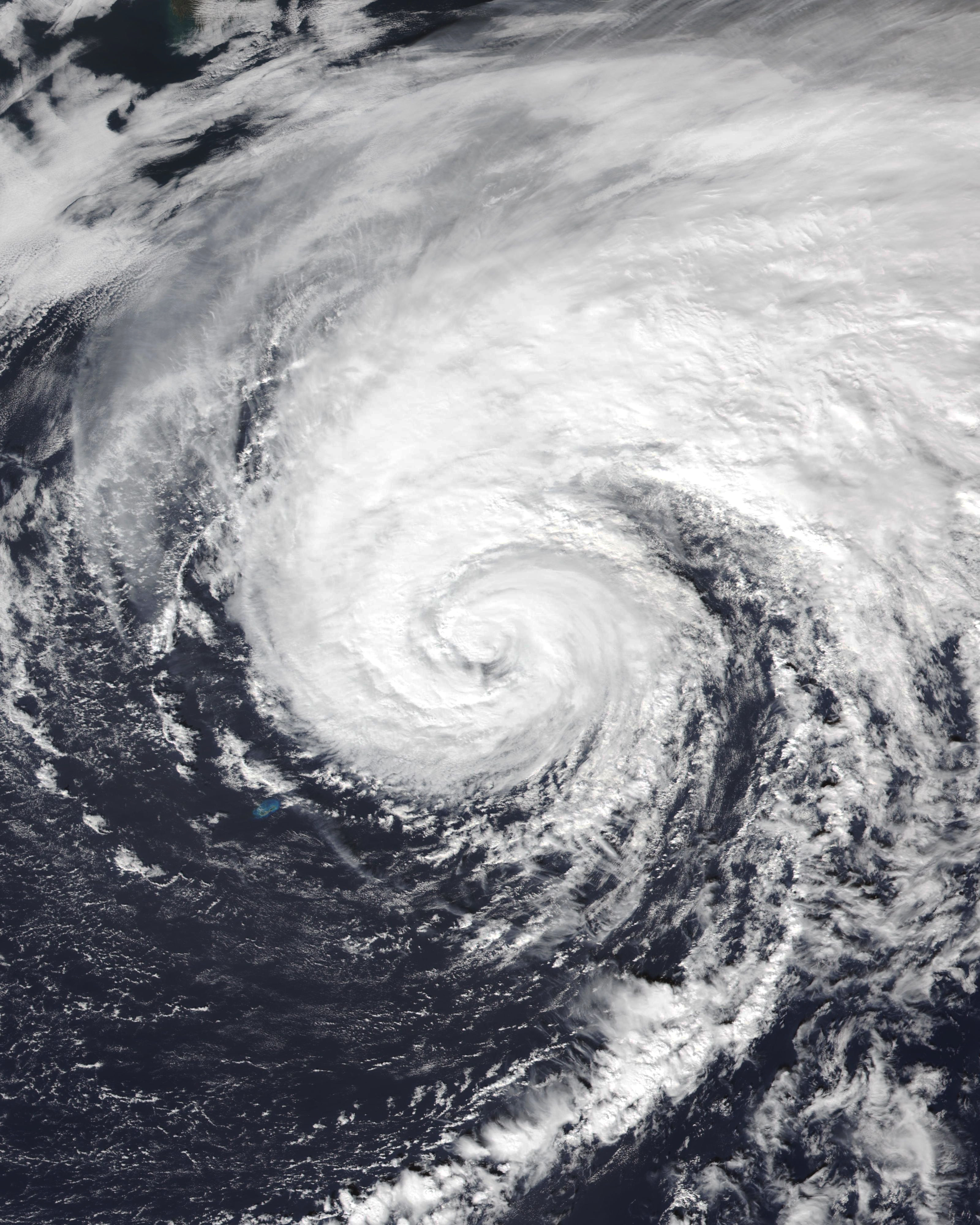
Epsilon as a weakening Category 1 hurricane on October 23, with Bermuda visible just southwest of the storm

Epsilon's large wind field prompted the issuance of a tropical storm watch for Bermuda at 15:00 UTC on October 20, which was later upgraded to a warning 24 hours later. As the hurricane began moving away from Bermuda on October 23, the tropical storm warning was cancelled. Despite the Bermuda Weather Service not forecasting hurricane-force winds to impact the island, the Government of Bermuda advised residents to prepare for power outages and to check their emergency supplies. Though no transportation disruptions were anticipated, bikers were warned to be cautious of strong wind gusts. Dangerous Surf Advisories were posted on southern-facing beaches, with residents urged to stay out of the water. The start of the World Tens Series had to be postponed from October 24 to the following day, to avoid severe weather from Epsilon.

Between October 22–23, Epsilon passed just 190 miles (310 km) east of Bermuda. Several locations of the island reported tropical storm-force winds, owing to the hurricane's large wind field. Sustained winds peaked at about 49 mph (79 km/h), with the highest wind gust measured at 60 mph (97 km/h), which was recorded at the Maritime Operations Centre, at an elevation of about 290 feet (88,000 mm). Tropical storm-force winds were also reported on Pearl Island and The Crescent, while a wind gust of 38 mph (61 km/h) was registered at the L.F. Wade International Airport. Only minor wind damage occurred on the island, while most weak trees and tree branches had already been downed by previous Hurricanes Paulette and Teddy. The outer bands of the storm only brought scattered showers to Bermuda, with a peak precipitation amount of 0.42 inches (11 mm) being reported at the L.F. Wade International Airport. Epsilon produced dangerous swells along the coast of Bermuda, forcing lifeguards at Horseshoe Bay to briefly halt services. In St. George's, video taken by Bernews showed waves crashing over small seawalls. Photos also showed waves ponding on nearby sidewalks and roads. Overall, damage in Bermuda was minor, and the storm's impact was compared to that of winter gales on the island.

=== United States and British Isles ===
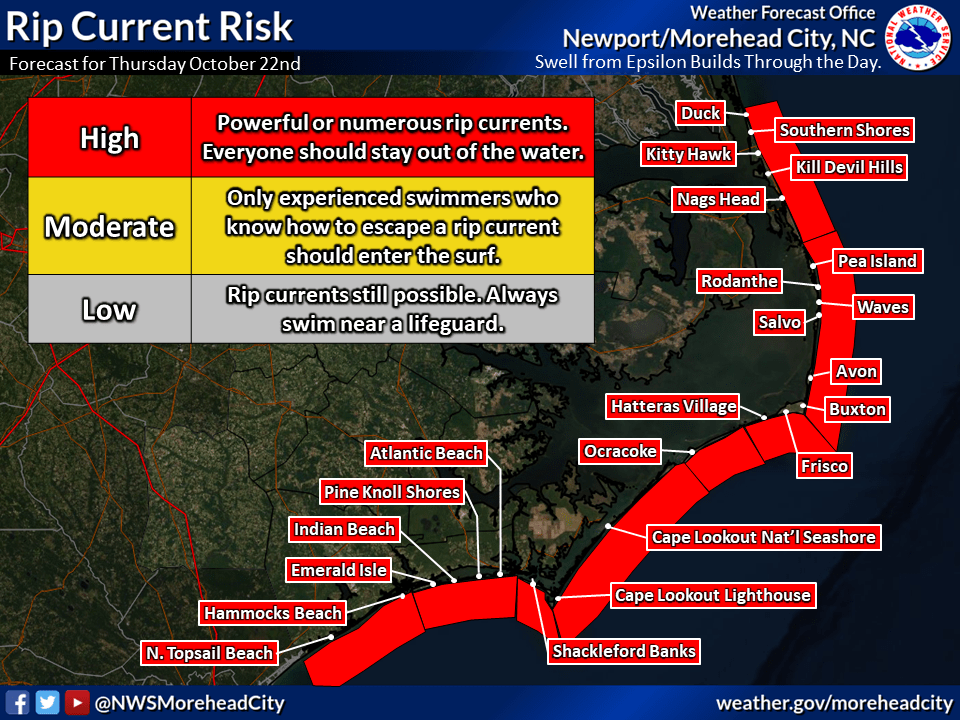
A rip current risk forecast for the coast of North Carolina on October 22, produced by the National Weather Service, as a result of Hurricane Epsilon

Epsilon produced large swells and rip currents from the Virgin Islands and Puerto Rico, northward through the entire East Coast of the United States. On the island of Puerto Rico, coastal flood and rip current advisories were issued by the National Weather Service (NWS) office in San Juan. Large waves were reported in Veja Baja, as shown by video posted on Twitter. High surf also affected the neighboring Virgin Islands. In Daytona Beach, Florida, a direct death occurred when a 27-year-old man drowned in rip currents produced by Epsilon. In North Carolina, an offshore buoy near Diamond Shoals reported an increase in wave size from 5 to 12 feet (1.5 to 3.7 m) overnight between October 22–23. Along the coast of North Carolina, rip current warnings were posted from the Outer Banks to as far south as North Topsail Beach. Increased swells and rip currents also threatened swimmers in South Carolina, causing red flags to be raised in Myrtle Beach. Long-period swells that reached heights of 5–8 feet (1.5–2.4 m) affected the coasts of New Jersey, Long Island, and New York City. Life-threatening swells and rip currents also impacted the coast of New England.

The remnants of Epsilon, along with a tailing occluded front, brought severe weather to the British Isles. In advance, Met Éireann issued a yellow rainfall warning for the counties of Galway and Mayo. Meanwhile, yellow wind warnings were ordered for Clare, Donegal, Galway, Kerry, and Mayo Counties. Another yellow wind warning was placed in effect for Wexford, Cork, and Waterford. The Met Office also issued yellow warnings for parts of Wales and North West England. Yellow rain warnings were also issued for parts of North West England, with the storm causing disruptions to train and bus services, and threatening flooding. In Ireland, the remnants of Epsilon caused outbreaks of rainfall and blustery conditions. In Northern Ireland, large swells of up to 98 feet (30 m) in height were recorded by offshore buoys, sending skilled surfers to beaches, as spectators watched waves crash onshore. In the mainland United Kingdom, torrential rainfall and gusty winds of up to 70 mph (110 km/h) affected the region. Professional surfers were seen braving 20-foot (6.1-meter) waves in Cornwall. Meanwhile, the Royal National Lifeboat Institution (RNLI) warned residents of "colossal swells" and "extremely dangerous conditions", advising people to avoid swimming in the ocean.

=== Elsewhere ===
Rough surf from Hurricane Epsilon impacted the Leeward Islands, Greater Antilles, and the Lucayan Archipelago. While weakening, Epsilon brought swells of up to 23 feet (7.0 m) to the coast of Atlantic Canada. Moisture from the storm, along with a cold front, also brought gusty winds and rainfall to the region. Wind gusts up to 37 mph (60 km/h) impacted the Avalon Peninsula during the evening of October 24, where rainfall totals of up to 1.9 inches (48 mm) were recorded. In Portugal, the remnants of Epsilon produced one of the largest October swells on record in Nazaré.

== Naming ==
The 2020 season was the second (along with 2005) in which an alphabetic list of 21 storm names had been exhausted, necessitating use of the Greek alphabet auxiliary list. In March 2021, the World Meteorological Organization replaced that auxiliary list with a new 21-name supplemental list. As a result, the letter Epsilon will not be used to name another Atlantic hurricane.

== See also ==
- Tropical cyclones in 2020
- List of Bermuda hurricanes
- Timeline of the 2020 Atlantic hurricane season
- Hurricane Debby (1982) — Affected similar areas
- Hurricane Karen (2001) — Affected similar areas
- Hurricane Fay (2014) — Took a similar track, made landfall on Bermuda
