= Denmark Vesey House =

Historic house in South Carolina, United States

- U.S. National Register of Historic Places
- U.S. National Historic Landmark
- U.S. National Historic Landmark District – Contributing property
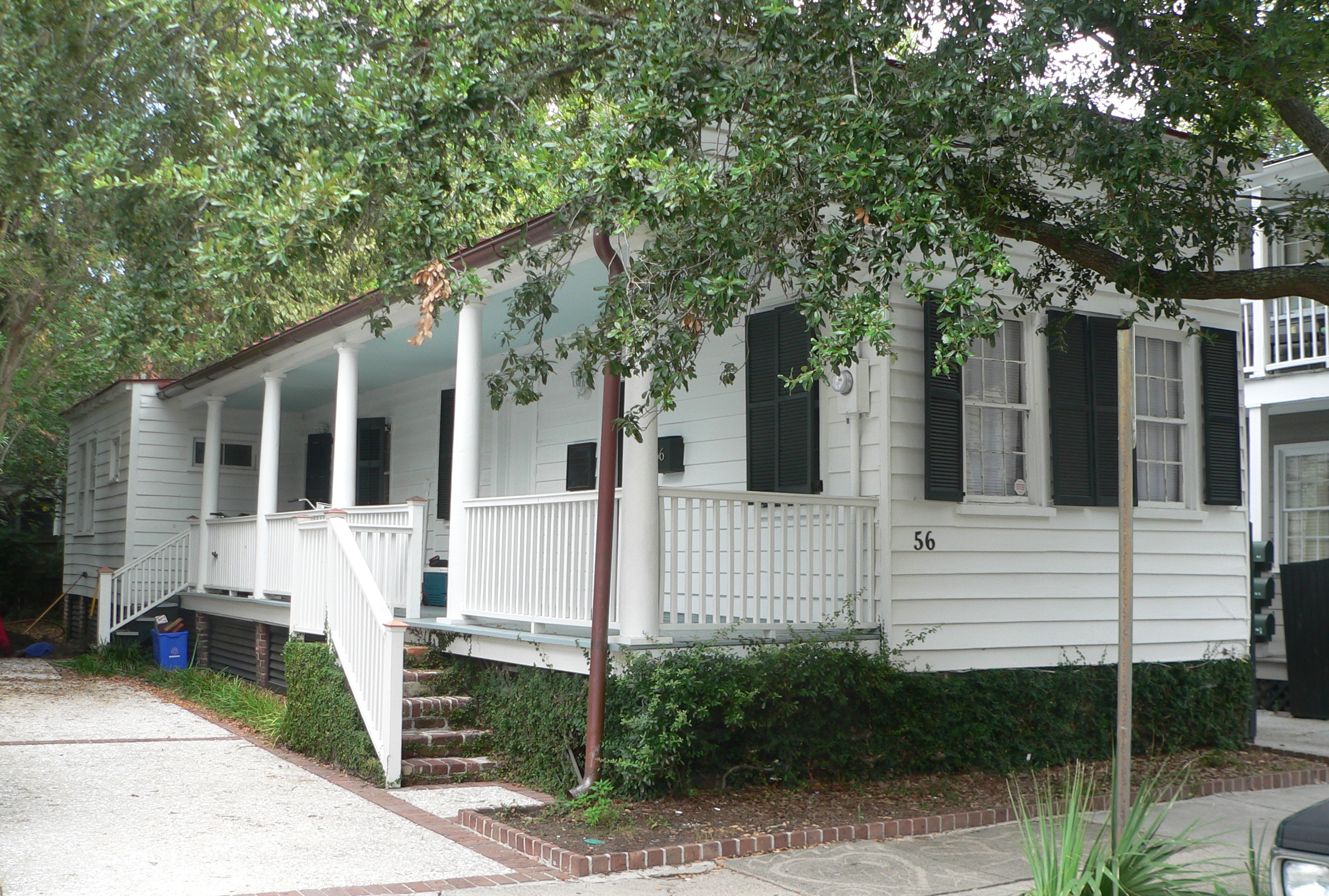
- 56 Bull Street

- Location within South Carolina
- Location: 56 Bull St., Charleston, South Carolina
- Coordinates: 32°46′55.7″N 79°56′28″W
- Built: 1800-1822
- Part of: Charleston Historic District (ID66000964)
- NRHP reference No.: 76001698

Significant dates
- Added to NRHP: May 11, 1976
- Designated NHL: May 11, 1976
- Designated NHLDCP: October 9, 1960

Commonly known as the Denmark Vesey House, the house located at 56 Bull Street in Charleston, South Carolina was for a long time thought to be the house once inhabited by black abolitionist Denmark Vesey. Vesey's home, listed as 20 Bull Street under the city's former numbering system, is now evidently gone. A nearby home, most likely built in the 1820s and currently numbered 56 Bull Street, was thought in the 1970s to have been the home of Denmark Vesey, and it was designated as a National Historic Landmark in 1976 by the Department of Interior. Vesey was hanged on July 2, 1822, and his body was never found. Despite these findings, the house has continued to be listed as a National Historic Landmark and is on the National Register of Historic Places.

The house described as the Vesey house is a single story wood-frame structure, oriented sideways to the street. The narrow street facade has two windows, while the longer west side has a porch extending across the front portion, with a wider addition to the back. Two doors enter the house from the porch. The interior of the front portion has three rooms, one beside the other, and the rear addition has four more.

== See also ==
- List of National Historic Landmarks in South Carolina
- National Register of Historic Places listings in Charleston, South Carolina
