= Bethel Methodist Church (Charleston, South Carolina) =

Historic church in South Carolina, United States

- U.S. National Register of Historic Places
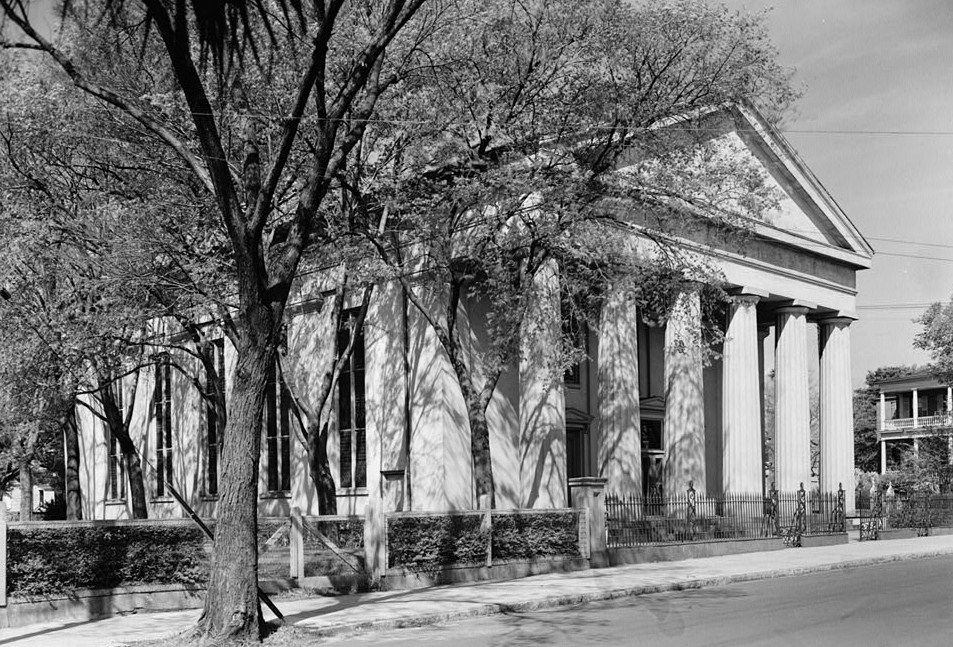

- Location within South Carolina Location within the United States
- Location: 57 Pitt St.
- Coordinates: 32°47′2″N 79°56′29″W
- Area: 1.5 acres (0.61 ha)
- Built: 1853
- Architect: Curtis, Mr.
- NRHP reference No.: 74002260
- Added to NRHP: January 31, 1978

Bethel Methodist Church is a congregation and the building located at 57 Pitt St. The congregation organized in the late eighteenth century and originally built a smaller wooden church on the site. It served both white and black Methodists.

This Greek Revival building was designed by E. Curtis in 1852 and completed in 1854. It was reserved for white members only. It was added to the National Register of Historic Places in 1975.

== Description ==
The new Greek Revival building, designed by E. Curtis, was dedicated on August 7, 1853, and completed in 1854. It cost $18,000. Inside were galleries supported by Doric columns, occupying one end and the two sides of the church.

The congregation moved its former building to the back of the lot, where it was used by black members. Only whites used the new church.

The new church was designed with a modern pulpit platform and carpeted chancel instead of the high pulpit and sounding board design of older churches. An article dated August 19, 1853, said that a large window was directly behind the pulpit and was flanked by richly ornamented pilasters of the Corinthian order.

== History ==
Methodists in Charleston purchased a half-acre lot at the southwest corner of Pitt and Calhoun streets in 1795 for use as a burial ground. They soon decided to construct a wooden church there called Bethel, and completed it about 1797–1798.

Following a dispute over use of the black burying ground and segregated seating, numerous black members followed Morris Brown and left this church. In 1817 he founded Hampstead Church, later known as Emanuel AME Church. Another leading member of that church was Denmark Vesey, who was convicted and executed in 1822 of a conspiracy for a slave uprising. Emanuel AME was suppressed, and whites burned it. Other blacks left this church in 1834, tired of being segregated to gallery seating. That year independent black congregations were prohibited by state law, following the Nat Turner's Rebellion of 1831 in Virginia.

With growth in the congregation, in 1852 they commissioned design and construction of a new building, the current Bethel Methodist Church, which was completed in 1853. Bethel Church was the only Methodist church in Charleston to remain open throughout the Civil War. The church leaders had the first wooden building relocated to the rear of the lot. It was used by remaining black members of this church.

In April 1882 following the Reconstruction era, the congregation donated the wood church to a nearby independent black congregation. This congregation moved it across the street, to 222 Calhoun Street. After this move, they added the portico. The older structure is known today as Old Bethel United Methodist Church. In the late nineteenth century, the Bethel Methodist congregation undertook a thorough renovation of their church in 1886. The fourteen-foot wide side galleries were removed and other work was in progress when the earthquake of August 31, 1886 hit. It caused damage that made further repairs necessary.

During the 1886–87 period, an alcove was added behind the chancel for a pipe organ, carpet and pew cushions were put in, and stained glass windows were installed. The tin coved ceiling was placed in the building during repairs following the hurricane of 1893. The unusual stenciling was applied to the interior walls in the late nineteenth century and is renewed each time the building is painted.
