= Morris Brown =

African Methodist Episcopal Church founder (1770–1848)

The Right Reverend Morris Brown
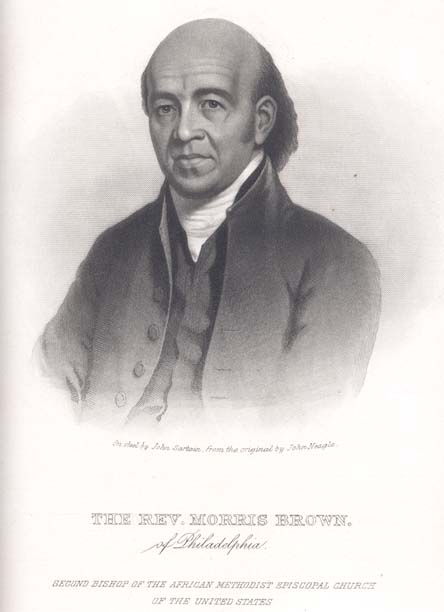
- Church: African Methodist Episcopal Church
- Predecessor: Richard Allen
- Successor: Daniel Payne

Personal details
- Born: January 8, 1770 Charleston, South Carolina
- Died: May 9, 1849 (aged 79) Philadelphia, Pennsylvania, US
- Denomination: African Methodist Episcopal Church
- Occupation: 2nd bishop of African Methodist Episcopal Church and shoemaker

Morris Brown (January 8, 1770 – May 9, 1849) was one of the founders of the African Methodist Episcopal Church, and its second presiding bishop. He founded Emanuel AME Church in his native Charleston, South Carolina. It was implicated in the slave uprising planned by Denmark Vesey, also of this church, and after that was suppressed, Brown was imprisoned for nearly a year. He was never convicted of a crime.

After his release, he took his family to Philadelphia, Pennsylvania, where he worked closely with Bishop Richard Allen on expanding the church. After Allen's death, Brown was selected as the second bishop of the AME denomination. He planted new congregations and established conferences of AME churches in the American Midwest and Ontario, Canada. He also mentored rising AME leaders such as the Rev. Daniel Payne, and encouraged formal education for new preachers and pastors.

== Early and family life ==
Born on either January 8 or February 13, 1770 to parents who were free people of color in Charleston, South Carolina, Brown received no formal education. This was typical for many common people in those years before public schools were founded, and he was taught skills at home. He and his family were successful and considered part of the city's free Black American elite. Its large black population was mostly enslaved in the antebellum years.

Brown became a skilled shoemaker. After a religious experience in the Methodist Church, he received a license to preach. In this period, the Methodist and Baptist churches had evangelized to both free and enslaved African Americans. They allowed them to be preachers and members, but the church congregations usually required the people of color to sit in segregated sections.

Brown married Maria, and they ultimately had six children.

== Ministry ==
In 1817, Brown traveled north to Philadelphia, as he had learned that Rev. Richard Allen and 15 delegates from four northern states had founded the African Methodist Episcopal Church there the previous year. This was the first independent black denomination in the United States. Pennsylvania courts had allowed Rev. Allen's Mother Bethel AME Church to legally split from the Methodist denomination. Rev. Allen ordained Brown a deacon, and the following year ordained him as an elder.

Rev. Brown returned to Charleston. African-American members of the white-dominated Bethel Methodist congregation were upset that white leaders had authorized construction of a hearse house on the site of the traditional black burying ground at the church. Bethel had allowed its black members, many of whom were enslaved, to meet for worship services in its basement, as was typical of many churches in the city. As a result of loss of the burial ground, Brown left the congregation in protest.

He was joined by many African Americans from Bethel and two other Methodist congregations, who formed a separate congregation, first known as Hampstead Church. It later was named as Emanuel AME Church. The church rapidly attracted members, as blacks were a majority in Charleston. It had a membership of 1848 in 1818, made up mostly of enslaved African Americans.

Denmark Vesey, also a free man of color, was among these founders and an influential leader. He was credited with planning a large-scale slave insurrection in June 1822. After white authorities crushed the plot, arresting and killing many suspects, including Vesey, they worked to suppress the Emanuel AME Church. Rev. Brown was imprisoned as a suspected collaborator for nearly a year, but never convicted. Angry whites burned his church to the ground in 1822 because of its association with the rebellion.

After being released in 1822, Rev. Brown fled to Philadelphia with his wife and two young sons, as did former slave Henry Drayton, and parishioners Charles Carr and Amos Cruickshanks. James Eden and most of the dispossessed African Americans in Charleston joined First Scots Presbyterian Church. Eden later sailed with the first emigrants from Charleston to Liberia, where he died many years later.

In Philadelphia, Rev. Brown resumed his shoemaking craft, according to census records. He also became Rev. Allen's valued assistant, and was formally named Mother Bethel's assistant pastor in 1825, and assistant bishop the following year.

Morris Brown was consecrated bishop (and Allen's putative successor) on May 25, 1828, at the denomination's General Conference. He traveled extensively to establish new congregations and conferences. At Hillsboro, Ohio in August 1830, Brown organized the denomination's western churches into the Western (later Pittsburgh) Conference. (They included 15 ministers and 1194 communicants, all in the territory between the Allegheny Mountains and the Mississippi River.)

In this period, Brown did not evangelize in the South. Beyond his history in Charleston, even free blacks could still be captured and sold into slavery. Emanuel AME church had reopened for a time in Charleston, but the state closed it and other independent black churches in 1834 due to a legislative ban after Nat Turner's slave rebellion in 1831 in Virginia. This uprising frightened the whites in slave societies. The congregation met secretly until after the Civil War.

During the antebellum years the Baltimore AME conference thrived; that city had a large population of free people of color. Three AME churches were founded in Virginia before the Civil War, and in 1848 some African Americans in New Orleans requested a traveling evangelist from the General Conference.

Upon Allen's death in 1831, Brown succeeded him as the young denomination's leader. Edward Waters, who evangelized in the Midwest, was named his assistant the following year; he was consecrated as bishop during the General Conference in 1836. He resigned that position in 1844 and resumed status as an elder (and died in Baltimore on June 5, 1847).

After Ohio began enforcing notorious Black Codes in 1829, and other states (including Pennsylvania in 1838) followed suit, many African Americans moved further north, including into Canada. Bishop Brown organized the Canada Conference in Toronto, Ontario, in July 1840. By the Civil War, an estimated 30,000 refugee African Americans are believed to have settled in Canada, mostly in Ontario. The General Conference that year also assigned two missionaries: Elder N. Cannon to New England and Elder William Paul Quinn to the West (as the Midwest was then known).

Growth within the latter also allowed its division: the Indiana conference was established at Blue River in October 1840 and Elder Quinn assigned to supervise both parts of the former Western conferences. At the May 1844 General Conference, Elder Quinn reported that he had established 47 churches with 2000 members (including one each in the slave cities of Louisville, Kentucky and St. Louis, Missouri). He was assisted by 20 traveling and 27 local preachers. Fifty Sunday schools had also been organized (with 2000 students), as well as forty temperance societies and 17 camp meetings. Rev. Quinn was consecrated as (suffragan) bishop and Bishop Brown's putative successor.

Aware that his own limited literacy affected his preaching, Brown mentored Daniel Payne, who had moved to Pennsylvania from Charleston in 1835 after authorities closed his school. Rev. Payne studied at the Lutheran seminary in Gettysburg, then moved to Philadelphia. Beginning in 1841, he helped Bishop Brown educate the denomination's clergy. The following year, the Lombard Street riot occurred near Mother Bethel Church, reflecting racial tensions. At the General Conference of 1844, Brown helped Payne secure the adoption of a resolution requiring a regular course of study for ministers, which contributed to building the institution of the church. Payne became the denomination's first historiographer in 1848, and its sixth bishop (assisting Bishop Quinn) in 1852.

While in Canada presiding at its 1844 Annual Conference, Brown suffered a stroke that affected him the rest of his life. The Philadelphia Conference granted him a $200/yr pension in 1845. He continued as active in church affairs as his health permitted.

== Death and legacy ==
Morris Brown died in Philadelphia on May 9, 1849. He helped expand his denomination to include six conferences, 62 elders, nearly 300 churches and more than 17,000 members. His protege, Rev. Payne, delivered the eulogy.

He was first buried in the former Mother Bethel Burying Ground on Queen Street. Records for this were lost after the church split because of dissension over how to respond to the federal Fugitive Slave Law of 1850. It required even free states to use their law enforcement to support the law and aid in recapture of refugee enslaved African Americans. Many members of the congregation wanted to resist the law, and an active group had been established in the city to do so. Brown was later reinterred, next to founding Bishop Allen, within the Mother Bethel church.

After the American Civil War, Rev. Richard Harvey Cain of Charleston's Emanuel AME Church bought a Lutheran church building in the city. (Its congregation had declined by 1866). The following year he established the Morris Brown AME Church and became its first pastor, naming it in honor of Brown.

Morris Brown College in Atlanta, established in 1881 by the North Georgia Conference of the African Methodist Episcopal Church, was also named in honor of the bishop.

Morris Brown AME Church, located in the Brewerytown neighborhood of Philadelphia, Pennsylvania was also named in honor of Bishop Morris Brown.
