= Rue Chapel AME Church =

Historic church in North Carolina, United States

- U.S. National Register of Historic Places
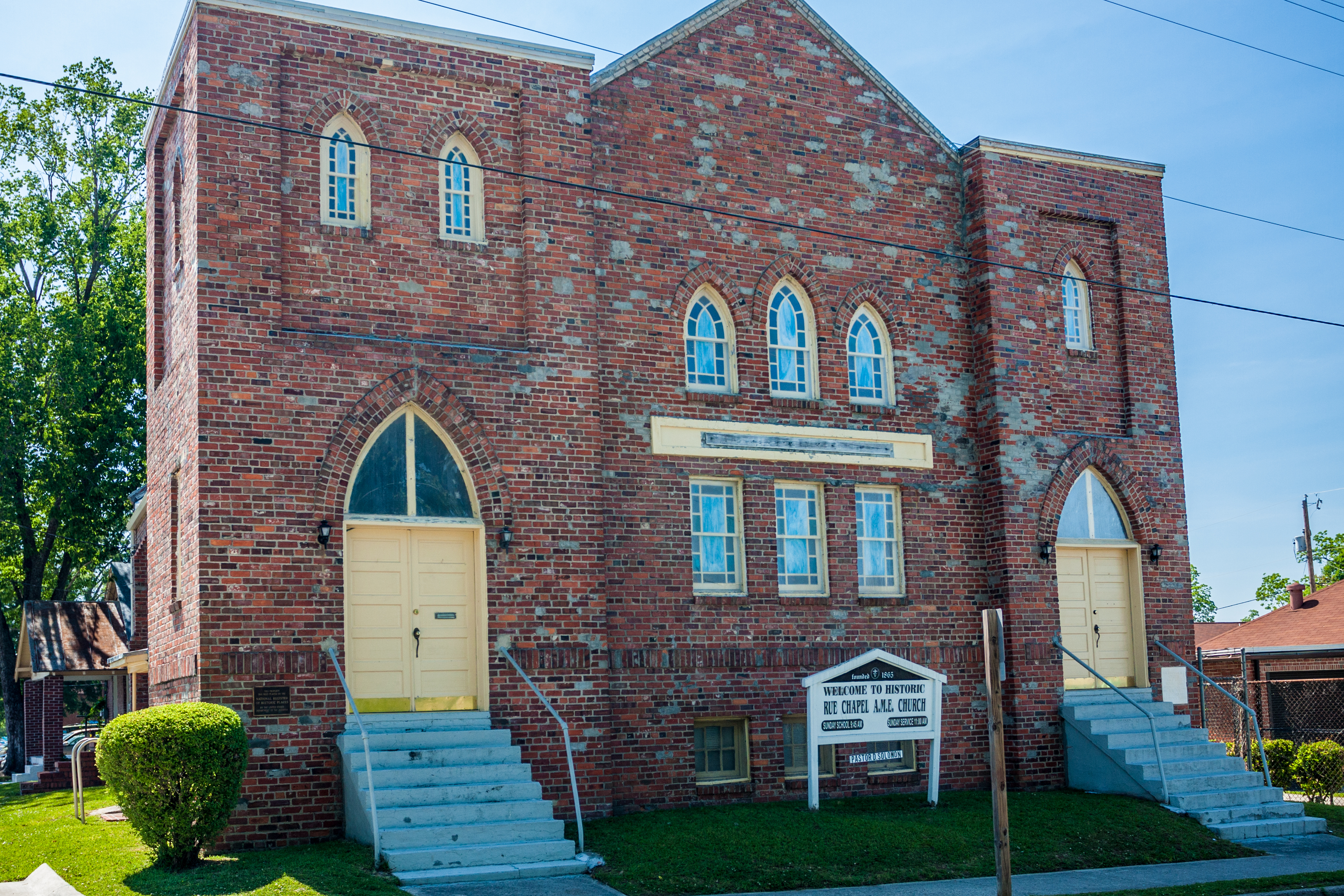

- Location within North Carolina Location within the United States
- Location: 709 Oak St., New Bern, North Carolina
- Coordinates: 35°6′39″N 77°3′0″W
- Area: less than one acre
- Built: 1941
- Architect: Lewis, Joseph F.; Becton, Willie
- Architectural style: Late Gothic Revival, Bungalow/Craftsman
- MPS: Historic African American Churches in Craven County MPS
- NRHP reference No.: 97000572
- Added to NRHP: June 30, 1997

Rue Chapel AME Church is a historic African Methodist Episcopal church located at 709 Oak Street in New Bern, Craven County, North Carolina. It was built in 1941, and is a rectangular brick church building in the Late Gothic Revival style. It features a gabled nave flanked by corner entrance towers. Also on the property is the contributing parsonage; a one-story, front-gable brick house of the American Craftsman style dated to the 1920s.

It was listed on the National Register of Historic Places in 1997.
