= Emanuel African Methodist Episcopal Church =

Historic church in South Carolina, United States

Emanuel AME Church
- "Mother Emanuel"; African Methodist Episcopal Church
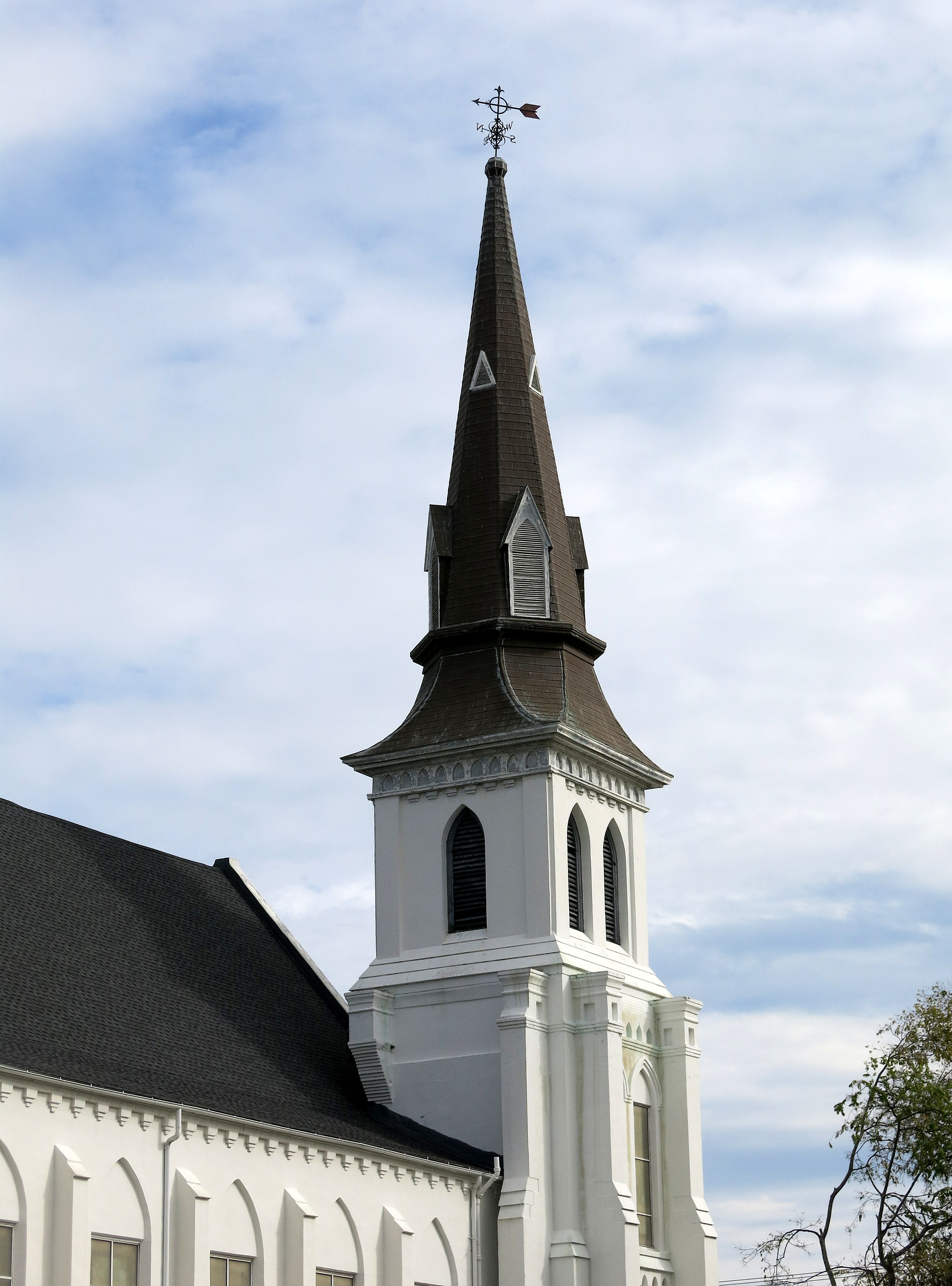

- Location within South Carolina Location within the United States
- 32°47′14″N 79°55′59″W
- Location: Charleston, South Carolina
- Country: United States
- Denomination: African Methodist Episcopal Church
- Website: motheremanuel.com

History
- Status: Church
- Founded: 1816
- Founder(s): Rev. Morris Brown; Denmark Vesey

Architecture
- Functional status: Active
- Architect: John Henry Devereux
- Style: Gothic Revival
- Groundbreaking: 1891

Specifications
- Capacity: 2500

Administration
- District: Seventh
- Parish: African Methodist Episcopal Church

Clergy
- Bishop: Samuel Lawerence Green
- Emanuel African Methodist Episcopal Church
- U.S. National Register of Historic Places
- U.S. National Historic Landmark District – Contributing property
- Location: Charleston, South Carolina
- Architect: John Henry Devereux
- Part of: Charleston Historic District (ID66000964)
- NRHP reference No.: 100003056

Significant dates
- Added to NRHP: October 25, 2018
- Designated NHLDCP: October 15, 1966

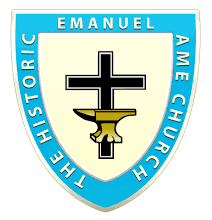
Coat of arms of Emanuel AME Church.

Emanuel African Methodist Episcopal Church, colloquially known as Mother Emanuel, is a church in Charleston, South Carolina, founded in 1817. It is the oldest AME church in the United States; founded the previous year in Philadelphia, Pennsylvania, AME was the first independent black denomination in the nation. Mother Emanuel has one of the oldest black congregations south of Baltimore (black Baptist churches were founded in South Carolina and Georgia before the American Revolutionary War).

== History ==
=== History and foundation ===
In the late eighteenth and early nineteenth century Great Awakenings, Baptist and Methodist missionaries had evangelized among both enslaved and free African Americans in the South, as well as whites. Blacks were welcomed as members of the new churches and some leaders were licensed as preachers. But the white-dominated churches generally maintained control of their institutions and often relegated blacks to segregated galleries or separate services, scheduled at alternative times or in such locations as church basements. State law and city ordinance required lawful churches to be led by whites. African-American members, most of whom were enslaved, were allowed to hold separate services in those churches, usually in the basements.

In Charleston in the nineteenth century, the white-dominated churches had increasingly discriminated against blacks. A dispute arose after white leaders of Bethel Methodist authorized construction of a hearse house over its black burial ground. Black congregants were outraged.

In 1818 church leader Morris Brown left this church in protest. Nearly 2,000 Black members from the city's three Methodist churches soon followed him to create a new church.

They founded a church known first as the Hampstead Church on Reid and Hanover streets. (Dates of founding have been given as 1816, when the national denomination was founded, 1817, when Morris Brown traveled to Philadelphia to meet with Allen and other founders, and was ordained as a deacon, or 1818.)

The congregation was made up of African Americans who were former members of Charleston's three Methodist Episcopal churches. Hampstead Church was considered part of the "Bethel circuit" of the African Methodist Episcopal Church, the newly established, first independent black denomination in the United States. It was founded in 1816 in Philadelphia, Pennsylvania by Richard Allen and delegates from some other black churches.

State and city ordinances at the time limited worship services by black people to daylight hours, required that a majority of congregants in a given church be white, and prohibited black literacy. In 1818, Charleston officials arrested 140 black church members and sentenced eight church leaders to fines and lashes. City officials again raided Emanuel AME Church in 1820 and 1821 in a pattern of harassment.

In June 1822, Denmark Vesey, one of the church's founders, was implicated in an alleged slave revolt plot. Vesey and five other organizers were rapidly convicted in a show trial, and executed on July 2 after a secret trial.

The city conducted additional trials over the following weeks, as the number of suspects increased while men were interrogated. They ultimately convicted and executed more than 30 men, and deported other suspected participants from the state, including Vesey's son. The original Emanuel AME church was burned down that year by a crowd of angry whites. After the congregation met secretly for a period, it rebuilt the church after the Civil War.

Rev. Morris Brown was imprisoned for many months, though never convicted of any crime. Upon his release, he and several other prominent members fled to Philadelphia, Pennsylvania. Others managed to reconstitute the congregation in a few years.

In reaction to Nat Turner's slave rebellion of 1831, in 1834 the white-run city of Charleston outlawed all-black churches. The AME congregation met in secret until the end of the Civil War in 1865.

=== After the Civil War ===
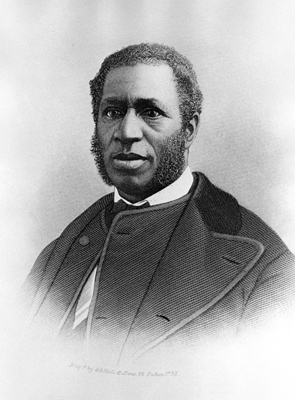
The Rev. Richard Cain, pastor of the church and member of the U.S. House of Representatives during Reconstruction

After the war ended, AME Bishop Daniel Payne installed the Reverend Richard H. Cain as the pastor of the congregation that would become Emanuel ("God with us") AME and Morris Brown AME In 1872, after serving in the South Carolina Senate (1868–72), Cain was elected as a Republican Congressman in the U.S. House of Representatives, continuing a tradition of religious leaders serving in political positions.

The congregation rebuilt the church between 1865 and 1872 as a wooden structure, under the lead of the architect Robert Vesey, the son of abolitionist and church co-founder Denmark Vesey. After an earthquake demolished that building in 1886, President Grover Cleveland donated ten dollars to the church to aid its rebuilding efforts. He wrote that he was "very glad to contribute something for so worthy a cause."

The current brick and stucco building was constructed in 1891 on Calhoun Street. This and other post-Civil War black churches were built on the north side of Calhoun Street. Blacks were not welcome on the south side of what was known as Boundary Street when the church was built. The building was designed by leading Charleston architect John Henry Devereux; the work was begun in the spring of 1891 and completed in 1892.

=== 20th century ===
In March 1909, Booker T. Washington, president of Tuskegee Institute and a national leader, spoke at Emanuel AME Church. Among the attendees were many whites, including a member of the Supreme Court of Pennsylvania and Robert Goodwyn Rhett, the mayor of Charleston; he was a lawyer and controlling owner of the News and Courier newspaper.

By 1951, the church had 2,400 members and completed a $47,000 ($582,981 in 2025 dollars) renovation project. This earned an "outstanding improvement" award from the Charleston Chamber of Commerce.

At a 1962 church meeting, Reverends Martin Luther King Jr. and Wyatt T. Walker of the Southern Christian Leadership Conference were guest speakers, urging church members to register and vote. At the time, most African Americans in the South were still disenfranchised, which they had been since the turn of the century when the white-dominated legislatures passed restrictive conditions raising barriers to voter registration in new constitutions and laws. In 1969 Coretta Scott King, then widowed after King's assassination, led a march of some 1,500 demonstrators to the church in support of striking hospital workers in Charleston. At the church, they faced bayonet-wielding members of the South Carolina National Guard; the church's pastor and 900 demonstrators were arrested.

The church building was damaged in Hurricane Hugo in 1989. Although major repairs were made, the tin roof soon rusted and leaked. It was changed out for interlocking copper shingles.

=== 21st century ===
As of 2008, the church had more than 1,600 members and assisted the Charleston Interfaith Crisis Ministry and other charities. The church is involved in the local arts community, including hosting an art show in 2013 and concerts by the Charleston Symphony Orchestra Gospel Choir.

In 2010, senior pastor and state senator Rev. Clementa Pinckney was noted as following in the tradition of earlier church leaders, such as the Reverend Richard H. Cain of the 19th century, in serving as both a religious and political leader.

On December 31, 2012, the church held a watchnight service; they celebrated the 150th anniversary of the Emancipation Proclamation, which was issued on January 1, 1863. Charleston's annual Emancipation Day Parade on January 1 ends at Emanuel AME Church.

==== 2015 shooting ====
On June 17, 2015, nine people were shot and killed inside Mother Emanuel. The victims included South Carolina State Senator Clementa Pinckney, senior pastor, and eight members of his congregation: Cynthia Hurd, Depayne Middleton-Doctor, Sharonda Coleman-Singleton, Susie Jackson, Myra Thompson, Tywanza Sanders, Ethel Lance, and Daniel Simmons. There was a tenth victim who was also shot but survived.

Dylann Roof, a 21-year-old white male, was arrested shortly afterwards and charged with nine counts of murder. The killings were investigated by state and federal law enforcement officials as a possible hate crime, and it was found that they were. According to the FBI, Roof left a manifesto detailing his racist views on the lastrhodesian.com website before the shooting. The church, on its own website, refers to Roof as "the stranger".

In December 2016, Roof was convicted of 33 federal hate crime and murder charges. On January 10, 2017, he was sentenced to death by lethal injection for those crimes. Roof was separately charged with nine counts of murder in the South Carolina state courts. In April 2017, Roof pleaded guilty to all nine state charges in order to avoid receiving a second death sentence, and as a result, he was sentenced to life imprisonment without the possibility of parole. While he will receive automatic appeals of his death sentence, he may eventually be executed by the federal justice system in the Terre Haute, Indiana death chamber.

After the shooting, Reverend Sharon Risher, daughter of victim Ethel Lance, became an activist for gun-violence prevention. Risher also advocates for the end to the federal death penalty.

==== After the 2015 shooting ====
The Rev. Dr. Norvel Goff Sr. served as the interim pastor from June 17, 2015, until early 2016. On January 23, 2016, The Rev. Dr. Betty Deas Clark was appointed pastor. She was the first woman to lead the congregation in its 200-year existence. Currently, The Rev. Eric C. Manning serves as Senior Pastor.

A memorial to the shooting opened at the church on November 14, 2026. Made from marble, it consists of a fountain containing the names of the nine victims along with benches.

== Building ==
Built in 1891, Emanuel AME Church has one of the few well-preserved historic church interiors in the area, with original features including the altar, communion rail, pews, and light fixtures. In December 2014, the church publicized fundraising to build an elevator to make the building more accessible. A pipe organ was installed in 1902. The church has a capacity of 2,500, making it among Charleston's largest black churches. It was listed on the National Register of Historic Places in 2018.

In 2014 the building was determined to suffer from termite infestation, which had resulted in "severe structural deterioration." The church received a $12,330 federal historic preservation grant from the state of South Carolina to complete a structural investigation in May 2014.

== Documentary ==
A producer of a documentary film, The AME Movement: African Methodism in South Carolina, that describes the history of the AME church movement in South Carolina, held a Kickstarter fundraising campaign in 2013, but failed to reach his goal. Various interviews were conducted and filmed for the documentary.

== In popular culture ==
Tyehimba Jess's 2015 book Olio mentions both the 1822 burning of the church and the 2015 shooting. The book of poetry and music begins and ends, respectively, with these events.
