= Bernews =

Bermudian English-language news website

- Type: Online Newspaper
- Owner: Bernews.com
- Founder: Patricia Burchall
- Editor-in-chief: Patricia Burchall
- Founded: 2010
- Language: English
- Headquarters: Hamilton, Bermuda
- Website: Bernews.com

Bernews is a Bermudian English-language online multimedia news website, founded by Patricia Burchall on 1 March 2010.

Bernews is Bermuda's first web-based news platform providing coverage 24 hours a day, 7 days a week.

Bernews also hosts several sub-sites, including BermudaElection.com, ForeverBermuda.com, BermudaCovid.com and Bernews.TV.

== Awards ==
Awards received by the publication include:

- The Bermudian Magazine's Best of Bermuda Awards – Best Source of Local News and Information, 2013
- Bermuda Yellow Pages People's Choice Award – Best News Provider, November 2012
- The Bermudian Magazine's Best of Bermuda Awards – Award of Excellence, 2011
- The Bermudian Magazine's Best of Bermuda Awards – Best Source of Local News and Information, 2011
- TechWeek Awards – Best Local Website, 2010
