= Denmark Vesey =

African-American anti-slavery leader (1767–1822)

- Born: 1767; St. Thomas, Danish West Indies
- Died: July 2, 1822 (aged 54–55); Charleston, South Carolina
- Cause of death: Execution by hanging
- Monuments: Denmark Vesey Monument
- Other name: Telemaque
- Occupations: Interpreter, domestic servant, carpenter, and pastor
- Known for: Convicted of plotting a slave revolt

Denmark Vesey (also Telemaque) (c. 1767 – July 2, 1822) was a free Black man and community leader in Charleston, South Carolina, who was accused and convicted of planning a major slave revolt in 1822. Although the alleged plot was discovered before it could be realized, its potential scale stoked the fears of the antebellum planter class and led to increased restrictions on both enslaved and free African Americans.

Likely born into slavery in St. Thomas, Vesey was enslaved by Captain Joseph Vesey in Bermuda for some time before being brought to Charleston. There, Vesey won a lottery and purchased his freedom around the age of 32. He had a good business and a family but was unable to buy his first wife, Beck, and their children out of slavery. Vesey worked as a carpenter and became active in the Second Presbyterian Church. In 1818, he helped found an independent African Methodist Episcopal (AME) congregation in the city, today known as Mother Emanuel. The congregation began with the support of white clergy and, with over 1,848 members, rapidly became the second-largest AME congregation in the nation.

His insurrection, which was to take place on Bastille Day, 14 July 1822, became known to thousands of Blacks throughout Charleston, South Carolina, and along the Carolina coast. The plot called for Vesey and his group of enslaved people and free blacks to execute their enslavers and temporarily liberate the city of Charleston. Vesey and his followers planned to sail to Haiti to escape retaliation. Two enslaved men opposed to Vesey's scheme leaked the plot. Charleston authorities charged 131 men with conspiracy. In total, 67 men were convicted and 41 hanged, including Denmark Vesey.

== Early life ==
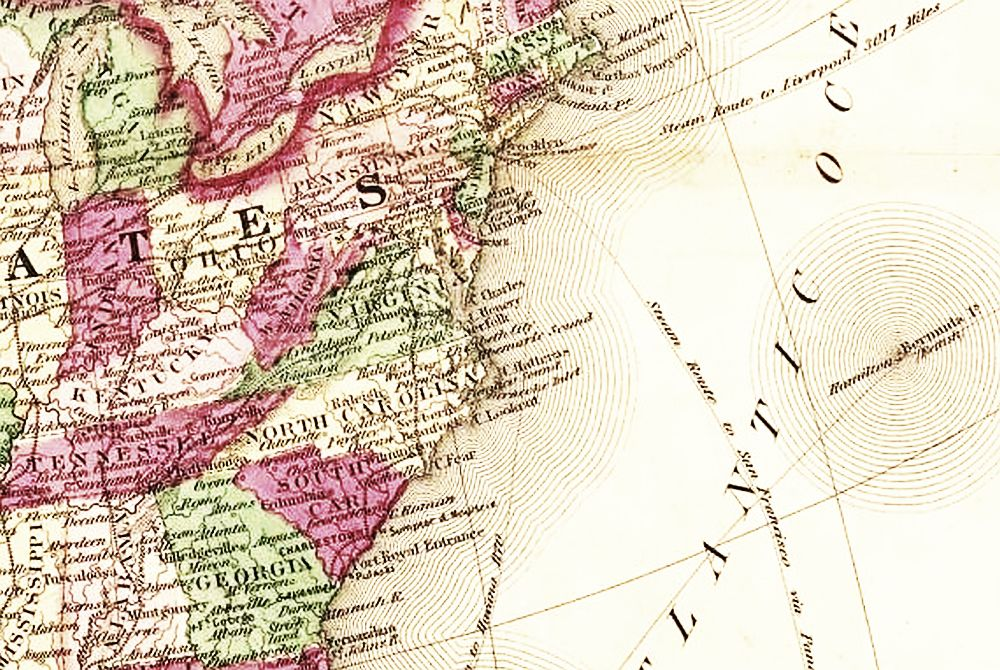
Map of Bermuda, Virginia, the Carolinas and Georgia

Manuscript transcripts of testimony at the 1822 court proceedings in Charleston, South Carolina, and its report after the events constitute the chief documentation source about Denmark Vesey's life. The court judged Vesey guilty of conspiring to launch a slave rebellion and executed him by hanging.

The court reported that he was born into slavery about 1767 in St. Thomas, at the time a colony of Denmark. Captain Joseph Vesey renamed him Telemaque; historian Douglas Egerton suggests that Vesey could have been of Coromantee (an Akan-speaking people) origin. Biographer David Robertson also suggests that Telemaque may have been of Mandé origin.

Telemaque was purchased at around the age of 14 by Joseph Vesey, a Bermudian sea captain and slave merchant. Little is known of the life of Joseph Vesey, though the Vesey family is one of some influence in Bermuda, more recently producing notable businessmen and politicians including master mariner Captain Nathaniel Arthur Vesey (1841–1911; MCP for Devonshire Parish), and his sons, Sir Nathaniel Henry Peniston Vesey, CBE (known as Henry Vesey; 1901–1996, MCP for Smith's Parish) and John Ernest Peniston Vesey, CBE (1903–1993), MP for Southampton Parish, and grandson Ernest Winthrop Peniston Vesey (1926–1994). After a time, Vesey sold the youth to a planter in French Saint-Domingue (present-day Haiti). When the youth was found to suffer epileptic fits, Captain Vesey took him back and returned his purchase price to the former master. Biographer Egerton found no evidence of Denmark Vesey having epilepsy later in life, and he suggests that Denmark may have faked the seizures to escape the particularly brutal conditions on Saint-Domingue.

Telemaque worked as a personal assistant for Joseph Vesey and served Vesey as an interpreter in slave trading, a job which required him to travel to Bermuda (an archipelago on the same latitude as Charleston, South Carolina, but nearest to Cape Hatteras, North Carolina, and originally settled as part of colonial Virginia by the Virginia Company) for extended periods; as a result, he was fluent in French and Spanish as well as English. Following the Revolutionary War, the captain retired from his nautical career (including slave trading), settling in Charleston, South Carolina, which had been settled from Bermuda in 1669. In 1796, Captain Vesey wed Mary Clodner, a wealthy "free East Indian woman", and the couple used Telemaque as a domestic at Mary's plantation, The Grove, just outside Charleston on the Ashley River.

== Freedom ==
On November 9, 1799, Telemaque won $1,500 (~$29,033 in 2025) in a city lottery. At the age of 32, he bought his freedom for $600 (equivalent to $11,610 in 2025) from Vesey. He took the surname Vesey and the given name of 'Denmark' after the nation ruling his birthplace of St. Thomas. Denmark Vesey began working as an independent carpenter and built up his own business. By this time, he had married Beck, an enslaved woman. Their children were born into slavery under the principle of partus sequitur ventrem, by which children of an enslaved mother took her status. Vesey worked to gain freedom for his family; he tried to buy his wife and their children, but her master would not sell her. This meant their future children would also be born into slavery.

Along with other slaves, Vesey had belonged to the Second Presbyterian church and chafed against its restrictions on Black members.

In 1818, after becoming a freedman, he was among the founders of a congregation on what was known as the "Bethel circuit" of the African Methodist Episcopal Church (AME Church). This had been organized in Philadelphia, Pennsylvania in 1816 as the first independent Black denomination in the United States.

The AME Church in Charleston was supported by leading white clergy. In 1818, white authorities briefly ordered the church closed for violating slave code rules that prohibited Black congregations from holding worship services after sunset. The church attracted 1,848 members by 1818, making it the second-largest AME church in the nation. City officials always worried about slaves in groups; they closed the church again for a time in 1821, as the City Council warned that its classes were becoming a "school for slaves" (under the slave code, slaves were prohibited from being taught to read). Vesey was reported as a leader in the congregation, drawing from the Bible to inspire hope for freedom.

== Background ==
By 1780, a majority of South Carolinians were enslaved, reflecting the numerous enslaved Africans imported to the state as laborers on the rice and indigo plantations. Exports of these commodity crops and cotton from the offshore Sea Islands produced the wealth South Carolina's planters enjoyed. This elite class controlled the legislature for decades after the American Revolution. The state, the Lowcountry, and the city of Charleston had a majority of the population who were enslaved Africans. By the late 18th century, slaves were increasingly "country born," native to the United States. They were generally considered more tractable than newly enslaved Africans. Connections of kinship and personal relations extended between slaves in the city of Charleston and those on plantations in the Lowcountry, just as those connections existed among the planter class, many of whom had residences (and domestic slaves) in both places.

From 1791 to 1803, the Haitian Revolution of enslaved and free people of color on Saint-Domingue embroiled the French colony in violence; Black people gained independence and created the republic of Haiti in 1804. Many whites and free people of color had fled to Charleston and other port cities as refugees during the uprisings and brought the people they enslaved with them. In the city, the new slaves were referred to as "French Negroes". Their accounts of the revolts and their success spread rapidly among enslaved Charlestonians. The free people of color occupied a place between the mass of Black people and the minority of whites in Charleston.

In the early 1800s, the South Carolina state legislature had voted to reopen its ports to import slaves from Africa. This decision was highly controversial and opposed by many planters in the Lowcountry, who feared the disruptive influence of new Africans on the people they enslaved. Planters in Upland areas were developing new plantations based on short-staple cotton and needed many workers, so the state approved the resumption of the Atlantic trade. The profitability of this type of cotton had been made possible by the invention of the cotton gin just before the turn of the 19th century. From 1804 to 1808, Charleston merchants imported some 75,000 slaves, more than the total brought to South Carolina in the 75 years before the Revolution. Some of these slaves were sold to the Uplands and other areas, but many of the new Africans were held in Charleston and on nearby Lowcountry plantations.

== Planning ==
Even after gaining his freedom, Vesey continued to identify and socialize with many slaves. He became increasingly set on helping his new friends break from the bonds of slavery. In 1819, Vesey became inspired by the congressional debates over the status of the Missouri Territory and how it should be admitted to the United States since slavery appeared to be under attack.

Vesey developed followers among the mostly enslaved Black people in the Second Presbyterian Church and then the independent AME African Church. The latter's congregation represented more than 10% of the Black people in the city. They resented the harassment by city officials. Economic conditions in the Charleston area became difficult since an economic decline affected the city.

In 1821, Vesey and a few slaves began to conspire and plan a revolt. For the revolt to be successful, Vesey had to recruit others and strengthen his army. Because Denmark Vesey was a lay preacher, when he had recruited enough followers, he would review plans of the revolt with his followers at his home during religious classes. Vesey inspired slaves by connecting their potential freedom to the biblical story of the Exodus, God's delivery of the children of Israel from Egyptian slavery.

In his 50s, Vesey was a well-established carpenter with his own business. He reportedly planned the insurrection to take place on Bastille Day, July 14, 1822. This date was notable in association with the French Revolution, whose victors had abolished slavery in Saint-Domingue. News of the plan was said to be spread among thousands of Black people throughout Charleston and for tens of miles through plantations along the Carolina coast. (Both the city and county populations were majority black; Charleston in 1820 had a population of 14,127 Black people and 10,653 white people.) Within the black population was a growing upper class of free people of color or mulattos, some of whom were slave-holders.

Vesey held numerous secret meetings and eventually gained the support of both enslaved and free Black people throughout the city and countryside who were willing to fight for their freedom. He was said to have organized thousands of slaves who pledged to participate in his planned insurrection. By using intimate family ties between those in the countryside and the city, Vesey created an extensive network of supporters.

His plan was first to make a coordinated attack on the Charleston Meeting Street Arsenal. Once they secured these weapons, they planned to commandeer ships from the harbor and sail to Haiti, possibly with Haitian help. Vesey and his followers also planned to kill white slave-owners throughout the city, as had been done in Haiti, and liberate the slaves. According to records of the French Consulate in Charleston, his group was reported to have numerous members who were "French Negroes," slaves brought from Saint-Domingue by refugee slave-holders.

== Failed uprising ==
Due to the vast number of slaves who knew about the planned uprising, Vesey feared that word of the plot would get out, and reportedly advanced the date of the insurrection to June 16. Beginning in May, two slaves opposed to Vesey's scheme, George Wilson and Joe LaRoche, gave the first specific testimony about a coming uprising to Charleston officials, saying a "rising" was planned for July 14. The testimony of these two men confirmed an earlier report from another slave named Peter Prioleau. Though officials didn't believe the less specific testimony of Prioleau, they did believe Wilson and LaRoche due to their unimpeachable reputations with their masters. With their testimony, the city launched a search for conspirators.

Joe LaRoche originally planned to support the rising and brought the slave Rolla Bennett to discuss plans with his close friend George Wilson. Wilson had to decide whether to join the conspiracy described by Bennett or tell his master that there was a plot in the making. Wilson refused to join the conspiracy and urged both LaRoche and Bennett to end their involvement in the plans. Wilson convinced LaRoche that they must tell his master to prevent the conspiracy from being carried out.

The Mayor, James Hamilton, was told, and he organized a citizens' militia, putting the city on alert. White militias and groups of armed men patrolled the streets daily for weeks until by the end of June, many suspects were arrested, including Vesey.

Suspects were held in the Charleston Workhouse until the newly appointed Court of Magistrates and Freeholders heard evidence against them. The Workhouse was also the place where punishment was applied to slaves for their masters and likely where Plot suspects were abused or threatened with abuse or death before giving testimony to the Court. The suspects were allowed visits by ministers; Dr. Benjamin Palmer visited Vesey after he was sentenced to death, and Vesey told the minister that he would die for a "glorious cause".

== Court of Magistrates and Freeholders ==
As leading suspects were rounded up by the militia ordered by Intendant/Mayor James Hamilton, the Charleston City Council voted to authorize a Court of Magistrates and Freeholders to evaluate suspects and determine crimes. Tensions in the city were high, and many residents had doubts about actions taken during the widespread fears and quick rush to judgment. Soon after the Court began its sessions, in secret and promising secrecy to all witnesses, Supreme Court Justice William Johnson published an article in the local paper recounting an incident of a feared insurrection of 1811. He noted that a slave was mistakenly executed in the case, hoping to suggest caution in the Vesey affair. He was well respected, having been appointed Justice by President Thomas Jefferson in 1804. Still, his article appeared to produce a defensive reaction, with white residents defending the Court and the militancy of city forces.

From June 17, the day after the purported insurrection was to begin, to June 28, the day after the court adjourned, officials arrested 31 suspects and in more significant numbers as the month went on. The Court took secret testimony about suspects in custody and accepted evidence against men not yet charged. Historians acknowledge that some witnesses testified under threat of death or torture, but Robertson believes that their affirming accounts appeared to provide details of a plan for rebellion.

Newspapers were nearly silent while the Court conducted its proceedings. While bickering with Johnson, the Court first published its judgment of the guilt of Denmark Vesey and five enslaved Black people, sentencing them to death. The six men were executed by hanging on July 2. None of the six had confessed, and each proclaimed his innocence to the end. Their deaths quieted some of the city residents' fears, and the tumult in Charleston about the planned revolt began to die down. Officials made no arrests in the next three days as if wrapping up their business.

=== Concerns about proceedings ===
Learning that the proceedings were largely conducted in secret, with defendants often unable to confront their accusers or hear testimony against them, Governor Thomas Bennett, Jr., had concerns about the legality of the Court, as did his brother-in-law Justice Johnson. The slave-holders of accused slaves and their attorneys, however, were allowed to attend the proceedings. Bennett had served almost continuously in the state legislature since 1804, including four years as Speaker of the House. He did not take any action at first because four people that he enslaved were among those accused in the first group with Vesey, and three of these men were executed with the leader on July 2.

Bennett consulted in writing with Robert Y. Hayne, Attorney General for the state, expressing his concerns about the conduct of the Court. He believed that it was wrong for defendants to be unable to confront their accusers yet be subject to execution. Hayne responded that, under the state's constitution, slaves were not protected by the rights available to freemen of habeas corpus and the Magna Carta. Vesey, however, was a free man.

=== Further arrests and convictions ===
On July 1, an editorial in the Courier defended the work of the Court. After that, in July, the cycle of arrests and judgments sped up, and the pool of suspects greatly expanded. As noted by historian Michael P. Johnson, most Black people were arrested and charged after the first group of hangings on July 2; this was after the actions of the Court had been criticized by both Justice William Johnson and Governor Bennett. The Court recorded that they divided the suspects into groups: one was those who "exhibited energy and activity"; if convicted, these were executed. Other men who seemed to "yield their acquiescence" to participating were deported if convicted. For five weeks, the Court ordered the arrest of a total of 131 black men, charging them with conspiracy.

In July, the pace of arrests and charges more than doubled, as if authorities were intent on proving a large insurrection needed controlling. But, the court "found it difficult to get conclusive evidence." It noted in its report covering the second round of court proceedings that three men sentenced to death implicated "scores of others" when they were promised leniency in punishment.

In total, the courts convicted 67 men of conspiracy and hanged 35, including Vesey, in July 1822. Thirty-one men were deported, 27 were reviewed and acquitted, and 38 were questioned and released.

=== Vesey's family ===
Vesey had at least one child, Denmark Vesey, Jr., who remained in Charleston. He later married Hannah Nelson. The remainder of Vesey's family was also affected by the crisis and Court proceedings. His enslaved son Sandy Vesey was arrested, judged to have been part of the conspiracy, and included among those deported from the country, probably to Cuba. Vesey's third wife, Susan, later emigrated to Liberia, which the American Colonization Society had established as a colony for formerly enslaved Americans and other free Black people. Two other sons, Randolph Vesey and Robert Vesey, both children of Beck, Denmark's first wife, survived past the end of the American Civil War and were emancipated. Robert helped rebuild Charleston's African Methodist Episcopal Church in 1865 and also attended the transfer of power when US officials retook control of Fort Sumter.

=== White involvement ===
On October 7, 1822, Judge Elihu Bay convicted four white men for a misdemeanor in inciting slaves to insurrection during the Denmark Vesey slave conspiracy. These four white men were William Allen, John Igneshias, Andrew S. Rhodes, and Jacob Danders. The men were sentenced to varied fines and short jail terms. Historians have found no evidence that any of these men were known abolitionists; they do not seem to have had contact with each other or any of the plotters of the rebellion. William Allen received twelve months in prison and a $1,000 fine, the harshest punishment of the four. When tried in court, Allen admitted to trying to help the slave conspiracy but said that he did so because he was promised a large sum of money for his services. Reports from the judge show that the court believed that Allen was motivated by greed rather than sympathy for the slaves.

The other white conspirators' punishments were far more lenient than Allen's. John Igneshias was sentenced to a $100 fine and three months in prison, as was Jacob Danders. Igneshias was found guilty of inciting slaves to insurrection, but Danders was charged for saying that he "disliked everything in Charleston, but the Negroes and the sailors." Danders had said this publicly after the plot had been revealed; city officials thought his comment suspicious. Danders was found guilty of showing sympathy to the slaves who had been caught ostensibly as part of the conspiracy. The final white defendant, Andrew S. Rhodes, received a sentence of six months and a $500 fine; there was less evidence against him than any of the other whites.

White residents of Charleston feared there could be more whites who wanted to help Black people fight against slavery. They were already concerned about the growing abolitionist movement in the North, which spread its message through the mail and via antislavery mariners, both white and black, who came ashore in the city. Judge Bay sentenced the four white men as a warning to any other whites who might think of supporting slave rebels. He also pushed state lawmakers to strengthen laws against both mariners and free Black people in South Carolina in general and anyone supporting slave rebellions in particular. Judge Bay thought these four white men were spared from hanging only because of a "statutory oversight." The convictions of these men enabled some white men of the pro-slavery establishment to believe that the people they enslaved would not stage rebellions without the manipulation of "alien agitators or local free people of color."

== Aftermath ==
In August, Governor Bennett and Mayor Hamilton published accounts of the insurrection and Court proceedings. Bennett downplayed the danger posed by the alleged crisis and argued that the Court's executions and lack of due process damaged the state's reputation. But Hamilton captured the public with his 46-page account, which became the received version of a narrowly avoided bloodbath and citizens saved by the city's and Court's zeal and actions. Hamilton attributed the insurrection to the influence of black Christianity and the AME African Church, an increase in slave literacy, and misguided paternalism by slave-holders toward slaves. In October, the Court issued its Report, shaped by Hamilton.

Lacy K. Ford notes that:

the most important fact about the Report was (and remains) that it tells the story that Hamilton and the Court wanted told. It shaped the public perception of events, and it was certainly intended to do just that. As such, it makes important points about the Vesey Court's agenda, regardless of the larger historical truth of the document's claims about the alleged insurrection and accused insurrectionists.

Ford noted that Hamilton and the Court left a significant gap in their conclusions about the reasons for the slave revolt. The importation of thousands of enslaved Africans to the city and region by the early 1800s was completely missing as a factor. However, fears of slave revolt had been a significant reason for opposition to the imports. He suggests this factor was omitted because that political battle was over; instead, Hamilton identified reasons for the rising that could be prevented or controlled by legislation which he proposed.

Governor Bennett's criticism continued, and he made a separate report to the legislature in the fall of 1822 (he was in his last year in office). He accused the Charleston City Council of usurping its authority by setting up the court, which he said violated the law by holding secret proceedings without protection for the defendants. The court took testimony under "pledges of inviolable secrecy" and "convicted [the accused] and "sentenced [them] to death without their seeing the persons, or hearing the voices of those, who testified to their guilt." Open sessions could have allowed the court to distinguish among varying accounts.

Believing that "black religion" contributed to the uprising and believing that several AME Church officials had participated in the plot, Charleston officials ordered the large congregation to be dispersed and the building razed. Church trustees sold the lumber, hoping to rebuild in later years. Rev. Morris Brown of the church was forced out of the state; he later became a bishop of the national AME Church. No independent black church was established in the city again until after the Civil War, but many black worshippers met secretly. In the 21st century, the congregations of Emanuel AME Church and the Morris Brown AME Church carry on the legacy of the first AME Church in Charleston.

In 1820, the state legislature had already restricted manumissions by requiring that both houses approve any act of manumission (for an individual only). This discouraged slave-holders from freeing the people they enslaved and made it almost impossible for slaves to gain freedom independently, even in cases where an individual or family member could pay a purchase price. After the Vesey Plot, the legislature further restricted the movement of free Black people and free people of color; if one left the state for any reason, that person could not return. In addition, it required each free black to have documented white "guardians" to vouch for their character.

The legislature also passed the Negro Seamen Act in 1822, requiring free black sailors on ships that docked in Charleston to be imprisoned in the city jail for the period that their ships were in port. This was to prevent them from interacting with and influencing slaves and other Black people in the city. This act was ruled unconstitutional in federal court, as it violated international treaties with the United Kingdom. The state's right to imprison free black sailors became one of the issues in the confrontation between South Carolina and the federal government over states' rights.

Following the passage of the Seaman's Act, the white minority of Charleston organized the South Carolina Association, which was essentially to take over enforcement in the city of control of enslaved and free Black people. In late 1822, the City petitioned the General Assembly "to establish a competent force to act as a municipal guard for the protection of the City of Charleston and its vicinity." The General Assembly agreed and appropriated funds to erect "suitable buildings for an Arsenal, for the deposit of the arms of the State, and a Guard House, and for the use of the municipal guard" or militia.

The South Carolina State Arsenal, which became known as the Citadel, was completed in 1829, when white fears of insurrection had subsided for a time. Rather than establish the municipal guard authorized in the act, the State and city agreed with the US War Department to garrison the Citadel with soldiers from Fort Moultrie.

=== Long term effect ===
In Prelude to Civil War, William W. Freehling provides an encapsulation of the Vesey conspiracy as it was viewed by the white elite of South Carolina, because "The planters' beliefs about the affair, rather than what was objectively true, produced their intransigence in the face of abolitionists." Many Palmetto State planters, in fact, blamed the Vesey plot and other slave conspiracies on northern abolitionists, who, they believed, met slaves at night in the guise of Yankee peddlers to trade alcohol for stolen plantation supplies and indoctrinate them with propaganda about civil rights in drunken sessions. These kinds of beliefs served to further over-sensitize the planters to abolitionist advocacy, even at a time when they were not at all popular in the North or generally influential in the country. This rawness was an important factor in creating the state's obstinate positions in both the Nullification Crisis of 1832-33 and the Secession Crisis which led to the Civil War.

== Historical debate ==
The Court published its report in 1822 as An Official Report of the Trials of Sundry Negroes ... This was the first full account, as newspaper coverage had been very restricted during the secret proceedings. In particular, the Court collected all the information available on Vesey in the last two weeks of his life and eight weeks following his hanging. Their Report has been the basis of historians' interpretations of Vesey's life and the rebellion. Since the mid-20th century, most historians have evaluated the conspiracy in terms of black resistance to slavery, with some focusing on the plot, others on the character of Vesey and his senior leaders, and others on the black unity displayed. Despite the threats from whites, few enslaved Black people confessed, and few provided testimony against the leaders or each other. Philip D. Morgan notes that by keeping silent, these slaves resisted the whites and were the true heroes of the crisis.

In 1964, historian Richard Clement Wade examined the Court's report compared to manuscript transcripts of the court proceedings, of which two versions exist. Based on numerous discrepancies he found and the lack of material evidence at the time of the "trials," he suggested that the Vesey Conspiracy was mostly "angry talk" and that the plot was not well founded for action. He noted how little evidence was found for such a plot: no arms caches were discovered, no firm date appeared to have been set, and no well-organized underground apparatus was found, but both Black and white people widely believed there was a well-developed insurrection in the works. Claiming, erroneously, that both Justice William Johnson and his brother-in-law Governor Thomas Bennett Jr. had strong doubts about the existence of a conspiracy, Wade concluded that among black and white Charleston residents, there were "strong grievances on one side and deep fears on the other," creating a basis for belief in a broad rebellion. Wade's conclusion that the conspiracy was not well-formed was criticized later by William W. Freehling and other historians, particularly as Wade was found to have overlooked some material.

In 2001, Michael P. Johnson criticized three histories of Vesey and the conspiracy that were published in 1999. Based on his study of the primary documents, he suggested that historians had overinterpreted the evidence gathered at the end of Vesey's life from the testimony of witnesses under tremendous pressure in court. He said historians too wholeheartedly accepted such witness testimony as fact and noted specific "interpretive improvisations." For instance, historians have described Vesey's physical appearance, which was not documented in the court record. However, the free black carpenter Thomas Brown, who occasionally worked with Vesey, described him as a "large, stout man" and as having "dark skin". In response to Johnson's work, Philip D. Morgan notes that in the 19th century, Vesey was once described as a mulatto or free person of color by William Gilmore Simms, who however, never met Vesey and incorrectly placed him in Haiti during the 1791 revolt. Morgan suggests that this confusion concerning Vesey's ancestry and skin color represents modern sensibilities more than any actual evidence.

Johnson found that the two versions of the court manuscript transcripts disagreed and contained material not in the court's official report. He concluded that the report was an attempt by the Court to suggest that formal trials had been held since the proceedings had not followed accepted procedures for trials and due process. Their proceedings had been held secretly, and some defendants could not confront their accusers. After Vesey and the first five conspirators were executed, the Court approved the arrest of another 82 suspects in July, more than twice as many as had been arrested in June. Johnson suggested that, after public criticism, the Court was motivated to prove there was a conspiracy.

Morgan notes that two prominent men indicated concerns about the Court. In addition, he notes that Bertram Wyatt-Brown in his Southern Honor: Ethics and Behavior in the Old South (p. 402) said that prosecutions of slave revolts were typically so arbitrary that they should be considered a "communal rite" and "celebration of white solidarity." "a religious more than a normal criminal process." Morgan thinks that historians have too often ignored that warning and supports Johnson's close examination of the variations among the Vesey court records.

Wade and Johnson suggest that Mayor James Hamilton, Jr., of Charleston may have exaggerated rumors of the conspiracy to use as a "political wedge issue" against moderate Governor Thomas Bennett Jr. in their rivalry and efforts to attract white political support. Hamilton knew that four people that Bennett enslaved had been arrested as suspects; three men were executed on July 2 together with Vesey. Mayor Hamilton supported a militant approach to controlling slaves. He believed that the paternalistic approach of improving the treatment of slaves, as promoted by moderate slave-holders such as Bennett, was a mistake. He used the crisis to appeal to the legislature for laws, which he had already supported, to authorize restrictions on enslaved and free Black people.

Hamilton's article and the Court Report examine various reasons for the planned revolt. Extremely dependent on slavery, many Charleston residents had been alarmed about the Missouri Compromise of 1820, which restricted slavery from expansion to the western territories, and they felt that it threatened the future of slavery. Some local people suggested that slaves had learned about the compromise and thought they were to be emancipated. Whites blamed the AME Church, they blamed rising slave literacy, and the African slaves brought from Haiti during the Haitian Revolution. In 1822, beleaguered whites in Charleston uniformly believed that Black people had planned a large insurrection; such a scenario represented their worst fears.

Wade noted the lack of material evidence: specifically no arms caches were found and no documents related to the rebellion came to light. Johnson's article provoked considerable controversy among historians. The William and Mary Quarterly invited contributions to a "Forum" on the issue, published in January 2002. Egerton noted that the free Black carpenter Thomas Brown and other Black people familiar with Vesey or the Reverend Morris Brown, the leader of the AME Church, continued to speak or write about Vesey's plot in later years, supporting conclusions that it did exist. In 2004, historian Robert Tinkler, a biographer of Mayor Hamilton, reported that he found no evidence to support Johnson's theory that Hamilton conjured the plot for political gain. Hamilton ruthlessly pursued the prosecution, Tinkler concluded, because he "believed there was indeed a Vesey plot." Ford noted that Hamilton presented those aspects of and reasons for the insurrection that enabled him to gain control of slavery, which he had wanted before the crisis.

In a 2011 article, James O'Neil Spady said that by Johnson's criteria, the statements of witnesses George Wilson and Joe LaRoche should be considered credible and evidence of a developed plot for the rising. Neither slave was coerced nor imprisoned when he testified. Each volunteered his testimony early in the investigation, and LaRoche risked making statements that the court could have construed as self-incriminating. Spady concluded that a group had been about to launch the "rising" (as they called it) when their plans were revealed. Perhaps it was of a smaller scale than in some accounts, but he believed men were ready to take action.

In 2012, Lacy K. Ford gave the keynote address to the South Carolina Historical Association; his subject was an interpretation of the Vesey Plot. He said, "The balance of the evidence clearly points to the exaggeration of the plot and the misappropriation of its lessons by Hamilton, the Court, and their allies for their own political advantage." Charleston officials had a crisis in which not one white person had been killed or injured. Ford contrasted their actions to the approach of Virginia officials after the 1831 Nat Turner's Slave Rebellion, in which slaves killed tens of whites. Charleston officials said the "brilliant" Vesey led a large, complex, and sophisticated conspiracy; but Virginia officials downplayed Turner's revolt, stressing that he and his few followers acted alone. Ford concludes,

Enlarging the threat posed by Vesey allowed the Lowcountry white elite to disband the thriving AME church in Charleston and launch a full-fledged, if ultimately unsuccessful, counter-attack against the insurgency. The local elite's interpretation of the Vesey scare prepared the state for politics centered on the defense of slavery. The agenda reinforced tendencies toward consensus latent in the Palmetto state's body politic; tendencies easily mobilized for radicalism by perceived threats against slavery.

== Legacy and honors ==
- The Denmark Vesey House in Charleston, although almost certainly not the historic home of Vesey, was designated a National Historic Landmark in 1976 by the Department of Interior.
- In 1976, the city of Charleston commissioned a portrait of Vesey. It was hung in the Gaillard Municipal Auditorium, but was controversial.
- From the 1990s, African-American activists in Charleston proposed erecting a memorial to Denmark Vesey to honor his effort to overturn slavery in the city. The proposal was controversial because many white residents did not want to memorialize a man whom they considered a terrorist. Others believed that in addition to acknowledging his leadership, a memorial would also express the slave's struggles for freedom. The Denmark Vesey Monument, representing Vesey as a carpenter and holding a Bible, was erected in Hampton Park in 2014, at some distance from the main tourist areas.
- During the 2020 NFL season, Arizona Cardinals wide receiver DeAndre Hopkins wore a decal on his helmet with Vesey's name.

== In popular culture ==
Art

- Vesey died in 1822, before the invention of photography, and no portraits were drawn or painted of him during his lifetime. Visual depictions of him are speculative, an artist's conception of what he could have looked like.

Literature

- The title character in Harriet Beecher Stowe's novel Dred: A Tale of the Great Dismal Swamp (1855) is an escaped slave and religious zealot who aids fellow slave refugees and spends most of the novel plotting a slave rebellion. He is a composite of Denmark Vesey and Nat Turner.
- Martin Delany's serialized novel, Blake; or the Huts of America (1859–61), referred to Vesey and Nat Turner, as well as having a protagonist who plans a large-scale slave insurrection.
- Denmark Vesey is the name and basis for a character in Orson Scott Card's The Tales of Alvin Maker, an alternate history series of books set in the United States, which have been published from 1987 to 2014.
- Sue Monk Kidd's 2014 novel, The Invention of Wings, includes Denmark Vesey as a character; the slave revolt and its reaction are major plot points. The novel perpetuates the myths that Vesey practiced polygamy and that he was hanged alone from a large tree in Charleston.
- Denmark Vesey is spoken about in John Jakes' historical novel Charleston (2002).

Theatre

- Dorothy Heyward's drama Set My People Free (1948) refers to Vesey's life.
- After Denmark, a play by David Robson, is a 21st-century exploration of the historical Denmark Vesey.

Radio

- Vesey's life is retold in the 1948 radio drama "The Denmark Vesey Story", presented by Destination Freedom, written by Richard Durham
- The same script was retooled for The CBS Radio Workshop, retitled Sweet Cherries in Charleston and with some dialogue changes. Broadcast August 25, 1957, it tells the story of the aborted 1822 rebellion.

Television

- Vesey was the subject of the 1982 made-for-television drama A House Divided: Denmark Vesey's Rebellion, in which he was played by actor Yaphet Kotto.
- Several PBS documentaries have included material on Denmark Vesey, particularly Africans in America and This Far By Faith.
- Vesey was portrayed by Carl Lumbly in the 1991 television film Brother Future. Vesey's planned uprising plays a crucial role in the film's plot.

Music

- Vesey was the subject of a 1939 opera named after him by novelist and composer Paul Bowles.
- Joe McPhee's composition "Message from Denmark", featured on the 1971 album Joe McPhee & Survival Unit II at WBAI's Free Music Store, refers not to the country, but to Vesey.

== See also ==
- Nat Turner
- List of slaves
