= Queen Alexandra's Memorial Ode =

Work by John Masefield and Sir Edward Elgar

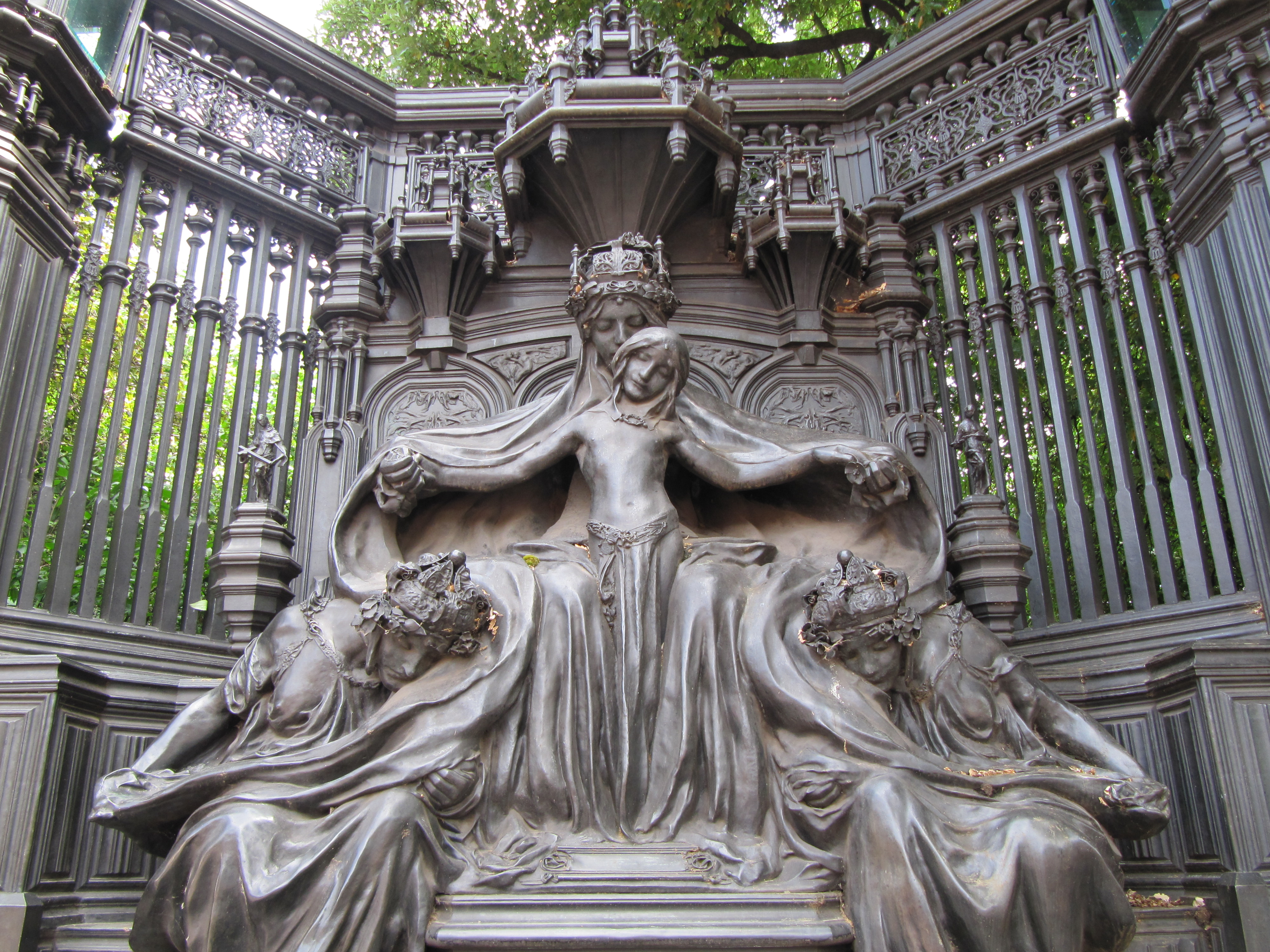
Detail of the Queen Alexandra Memorial, situated opposite St James's Palace in London

Queen Alexandra's Memorial Ode, otherwise known as "So many true Princesses who have gone", is an ode written by John Masefield and set to music for choir and orchestra by Sir Edward Elgar for the occasion of the unveiling of Sir Alfred Gilbert's memorial to Queen Alexandra on 8 June 1932 outside Marlborough House in London.

== History ==
It was Masefield's first commission as Poet Laureate, and Elgar, as Master of the King's Musick, was requested to set the verses in mid-May 1932, shortly before his seventy-fifth birthday. Elgar originally set the poem to an orchestral accompaniment but, due to a change of plan, the accompaniment was hurriedly re-arranged by Captain Andrew Harris of the Welsh Guards so it could be played by a military band.

The day chosen for the unveiling of the memorial by the King was Alexandra Rose Day. At the beginning of the ceremony outside Marlborough House, Elgar, wearing magnificent robes, conducted the chorister children of the Chapels Royal, the choir of Westminster Abbey, and the band of the Guards in a performance of the Ode.

The orchestra and band parts have since been lost. The only manuscript of the work is in the Library of St. George's Chapel at Windsor Castle: a vocal score handwritten by the composer, which includes indications of the orchestral instrumentation.

== The music ==
The work starts with a short fanfare-like figure, followed by a lengthy prelude by the orchestra (or band) before the choir enters, unaccompanied, with the words "So many true princesses who have gone". It is notable that though the work is in the key of E-flat it ends in the subdominant key of B-flat, giving a feeling of incompleteness: it is not known if the composer had intended to extend the work or if the effect was intentional. However the effect of the whole is of appropriate simplicity and wistfulness, and seems to ask for delicacy of instrumentation.

There are four verses of four lines, and the performing time is about six minutes.

== Lyrics ==
The lyrics to the song were written by John Masefield.

So many true princesses who have gone
Over the sea, as love or duty bade,
To share abroad, till Death a foreign throne,
Have given all things, and been ill repaid.

Hatred has followed them and bitter days.
But this most lovely woman and loved Queen
Filled all the English nation with her praise;
We gather now to keep her memory green.

Here, at this place, she often sat to mark
The tide of London life go roaring by,
The day-long multitude, the lighted dark,
The night-long wheels, the glaring in the sky.

Now here we set memorial of her stay,
That passers-by remember with a thrill:
"This lovely princess came from far away
And won our hearts, and lives within them still".

== Revival and recordings ==
- Choir and piano: So many true princesses who have gone (Queen Alexandra Memorial Ode) and other music by Elgar, performed by Barry Collett (piano) and Tudor Choir. On CD – The Unknown Elgar – Pearl SHECD9635
- Choir and orchestra: Queen Alexandra's Memorial Ode arranged by John Morrison for choir and small orchestra, performed by Bristol University Musical Society, at St. George's Church Concert Hall, Bristol in 2002
- Choir and orchestra: So Many True Princesses included with other revivals by Anthony Payne of Elgar's music (Third Symphony, 6th Pomp and Circumstance March). Adrian Partington Singers, BBC National Orchestra of Wales, cond. Richard Hickox. On CHANDOS CHSA5057
- Choir and military (wind) band: Musical Opinion: "Lost Elgar work returns to the wind band repertoire" – arrangement of Queen Alexandra's Memorial Ode for choir and wind band by John Morrison in 2010
- Wind band: Queen Alexandra's Memorial Ode arranged by John Morrison, first public performance, by the Nottingham Concert Band, 22 October 2011
- Choir and organ: Westminster Abbey Choir, conducted by James O'Donnell with Robert Quinney (organ) includes Queen Alexandra Memorial Ode (ed. Witt and Quinney) and other music by Elgar. On HYPERION CDA67593
