= Queen Alexandra Memorial =

Memorial in London

Coordinates: 51.5047°N 0.13677°W

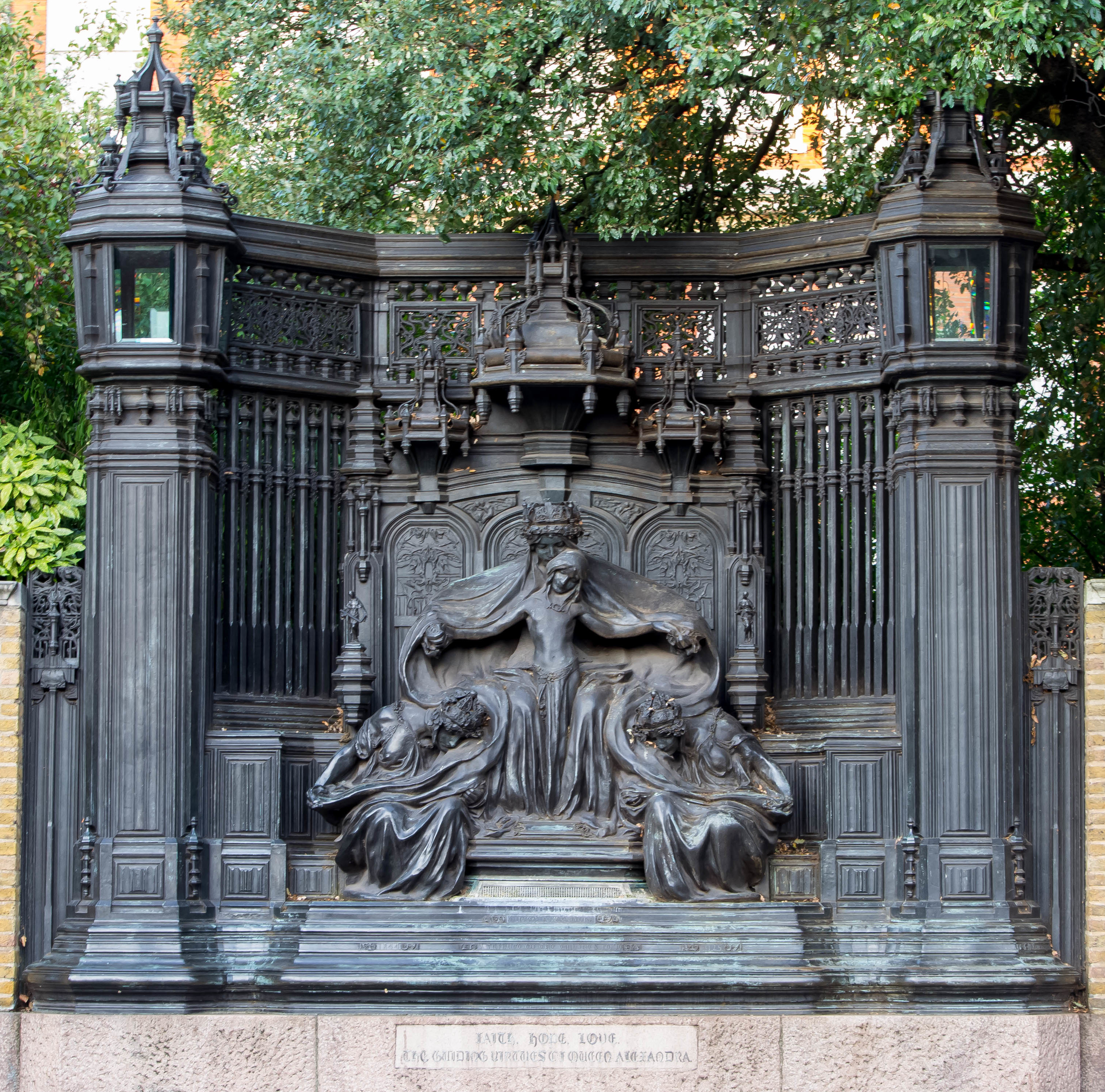
- Artist: Sir Alfred Gilbert
- Year: 1926–1932
- Dimensions: 575 cm × 540 cm × 180 cm (226 in × 210 in × 71 in)
- Location: London SW1

Listed Building – Grade I
- Official name: Queen Alexandra Memorial
- Designated: 5 February 1970
- Reference no.: 1239703

The Queen Alexandra Memorial on Marlborough Road, London, which commemorates Queen Alexandra, was executed by the sculptor Sir Alfred Gilbert between 1926 and 1932. It consists of a bronze screen incorporating allegorical figures, set into the garden wall of Marlborough House and facing St James's Palace. A late example of a work in the Art Nouveau style, it was regarded by the sculptor as his "Swan song".

Before 1926 Gilbert was living in exile abroad, having fled Britain in 1901 bankrupt and disgraced after failing to complete the tomb of the Duke of Clarence in St George's Chapel, Windsor Castle. Gilbert later claimed that the Duke's mother, Princess Alexandra (Queen Alexandra after her husband's accession to the throne as Edward VII), was the only member of the royal family who supported him after this debacle. She is also supposed to have expressed a wish in her old age that Gilbert might execute her memorial, should he outlive her.

In 1926 Gilbert was invited to return to Britain, a result of the machinations of his biographer, the journalist Isabel McAllister. She had the twofold aim of getting Gilbert to complete the Clarence tomb (which he had succeeded in doing by 1928) and to receive the commission for a memorial to Queen Alexandra, who had died the previous year. The artist Lady Helena Gleichen offered her studio in St James's Palace for Gilbert's use. The Committee to Erect a Memorial to Queen Alexandra was set up in late 1926 and approached Gilbert in December of that year.

The symbolism of the central sculptural group is explained by Gilbert in an "exegesis" he prepared for the committee in 1927:

Central Group—represents "Love Enthroned", supported by Faith and Hope, on either side, and Love is directing a Boy sent out across the "River of Life", which springs from beneath Her Throne—symbolizing Queen Alexandra's charity to Children, also the water typifies Her advent to Great Britain from across the water.

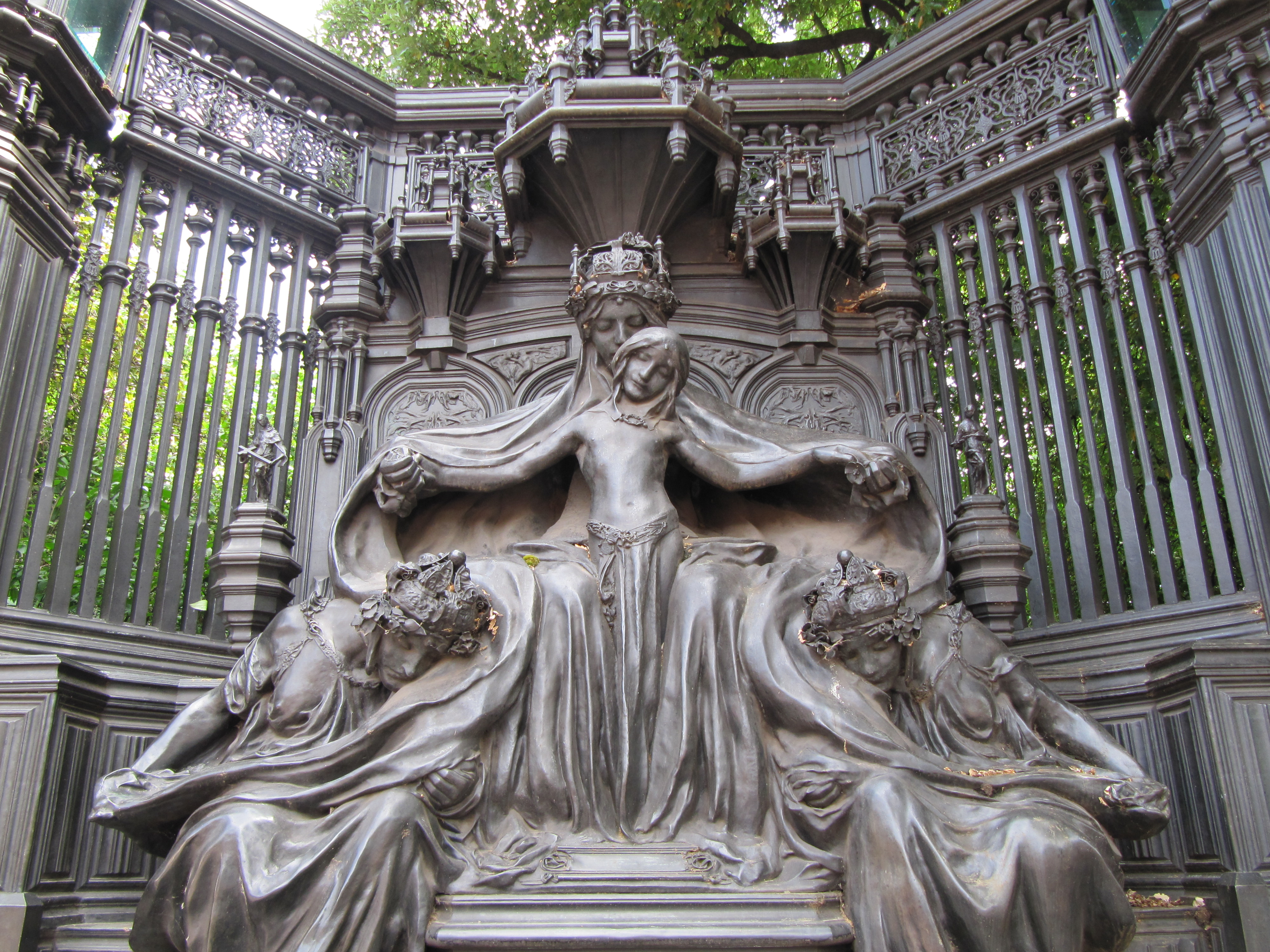
Detail of the central sculptural group

The composition is in a style adapted from Perpendicular Gothic architecture, with three buttressed and pinnacled canopies over the figures and linenfold motifs on the screen. Two further allegorical statuettes appear on finials on the throne, that on the left representing Religion and the other without an attribute to help with identification, though Truth has been proposed as its subject.

The two main inscriptions read QUEEN ALEXANDRA/ 1844 A TRIBUTE TO THE EMPIRE'S LOVE 1925 (on the bronze base) and FAITH, HOPE, LOVE./ THE GUIDING VIRTUES OF QUEEN ALEXANDRA (on the granite base below). A further inscription at the side of the bronze base reads A. B. BURTON. FOUNDER.

The memorial was cast by A. B. Burton at the Thames Ditton Foundry. It was unveiled on 8 June 1932 (Alexandra Rose Day) by George V. At the unveiling ceremony the memorial was blessed by the Archbishop of Canterbury, Cosmo Gordon Lang, and the choir of the Chapel Royal gave the first performance of Queen Alexandra's Memorial Ode, which had been composed for the occasion by the Master of the King's Music, Sir Edward Elgar, with lyrics by the Poet Laureate, John Masefield. On the following day Gilbert received his knighthood from the King at Buckingham Palace. The memorial was Gilbert's last completed public artwork, as he died in November 1934.

== Bibliography ==
- Dorment, Richard (January 1980), "Alfred Gilbert's Memorial to Queen Alexandra", The Burlington Magazine, 122 (922): 47–54
- Ward-Jackson, Philip (2011), Public Sculpture of Historic Westminster: Volume 1, Public Sculpture of Britain, vol. 14, Liverpool: Liverpool University Press
