= Alexandra of Denmark =

Queen of the United Kingdom from 1901 to 1910

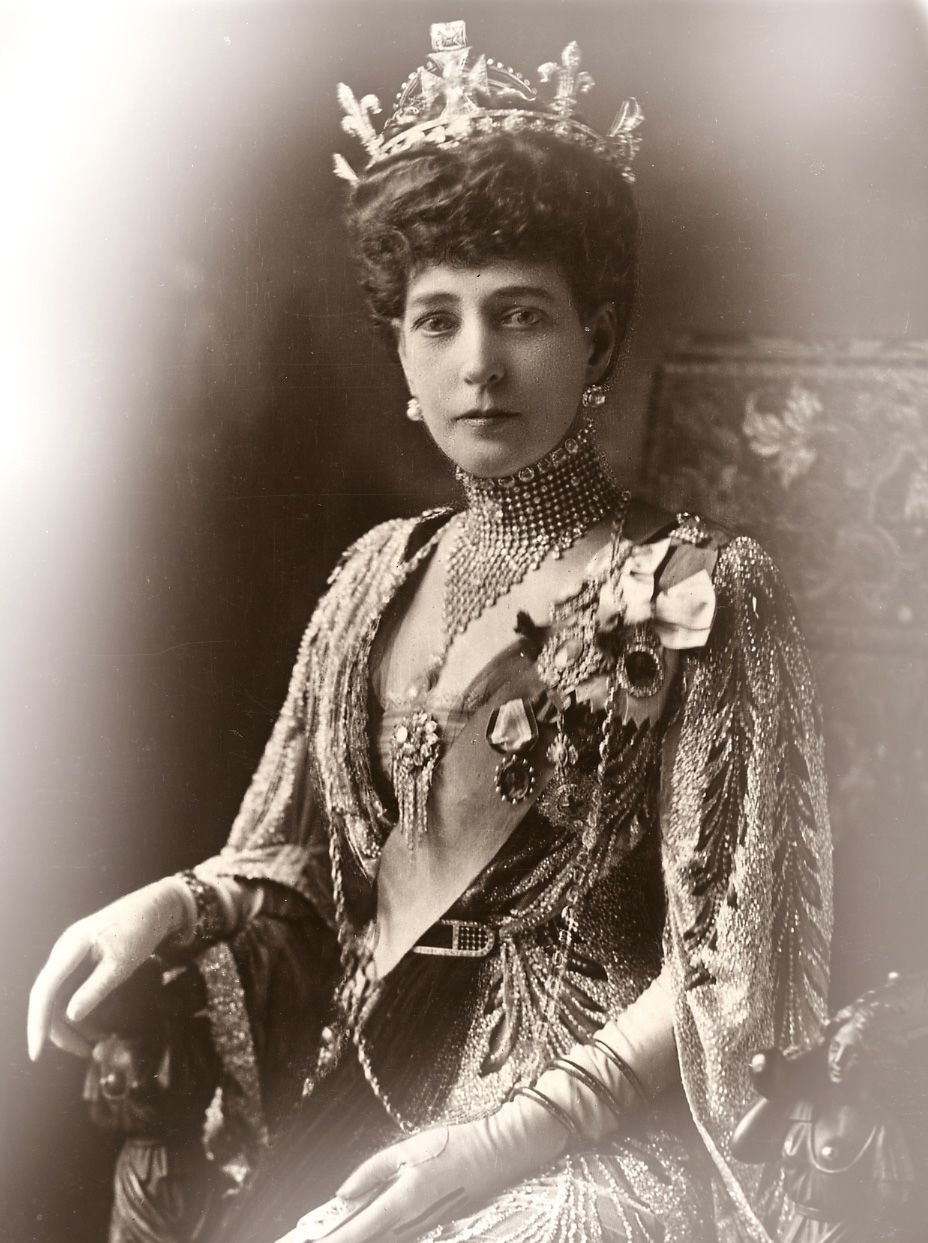
- Portrait of Alexandra in 1913

Queen consort of the United Kingdom and the British Dominions; Empress consort of India
- Tenure: 22 January 1901 – 6 May 1910
- Coronation: 9 August 1902
- Imperial Durbar: 1 January 1903
- Born: Princess Alexandra of Schleswig-Holstein-Sonderburg-Glücksburg; 1 December 1844; Yellow Palace, Copenhagen, Denmark
- Died: 20 November 1925 (aged 80); Sandringham House, Norfolk, England
- Burial: 28 November 1925 Albert Memorial Chapel, St George's Chapel, Windsor Castle 22 April 1927 South Aisle, St George's Chapel
- Spouse: Edward VII (m. 1863; died 1910)
- Issue: Prince Albert Victor, Duke of Clarence and Avondale; George V; Louise, Princess Royal; Princess Victoria; Maud, Queen of Norway; Prince Alexander John of Wales
Names
- Alexandra Caroline Marie Charlotte Louise Julia
- House: Glücksburg
- Father: Christian IX of Denmark
- Mother: Louise of Hesse-Kassel

Alexandra of Denmark (Alexandra Caroline Marie Charlotte Louise Julia; 1 December 1844 – 20 November 1925) was Queen of the United Kingdom and the British Dominions, and Empress of India, from 22 January 1901 to 6 May 1910 as the wife of King Edward VII.

Alexandra's family had been relatively obscure until 1852, when her father, Prince Christian of Schleswig-Holstein-Sonderburg-Glücksburg, was chosen (with the consent of the major European powers) to succeed his second cousin Frederick VII as King of Denmark. At the age of 16, she was chosen as the future wife of Albert Edward, Prince of Wales, the son and heir apparent of Queen Victoria. The couple married 18 months later in 1863, the year in which her father became king of Denmark as Christian IX and her brother William was appointed king of Greece as George I.

Alexandra was Princess of Wales from 1863 to 1901, the longest anyone has ever held that title, and became generally popular; fashion-conscious women copied her style of dress and bearing. Largely excluded from wielding any political power, she unsuccessfully attempted to sway the opinion of British ministers and her husband's family to favour Greek and Danish interests. Her public duties were restricted to uncontroversial involvement in charitable work.

On the death of Queen Victoria in 1901, Albert Edward became king-emperor as Edward VII, with Alexandra as queen-empress consort. She became queen mother on Edward VII's death in 1910, at which point their son George V acceded to the throne. Alexandra died aged 80 in 1925.

== Early life ==
Alexandra, known as "Alix" to her immediate family, was born on 1 December 1844 at the Yellow Palace, an 18th-century town house at 18 Amaliegade, immediately adjacent to the Amalienborg Palace complex in Copenhagen. Her father was Prince Christian of Schleswig-Holstein-Sonderburg-Glücksburg and her mother was Princess Louise of Hesse-Kassel. She had five siblings: Frederick, William (later George I of Greece), Dagmar (later Empress Maria of Russia), Thyra (later Crown Princess of Hanover) and Valdemar.

Her father's family was a distant cadet branch of the Danish royal House of Oldenburg, which was descended from King Christian III of Denmark. Although they were of royal blood, (Note: Her mother and father were both great-grandchildren of Frederick V of Denmark and great-great-grandchildren of George II of Great Britain.) the family lived a comparatively modest life. They did not possess great wealth; her father's income from an army commission was about £800 per year, and their house was a rent-free grace and favour property. Occasionally, Hans Christian Andersen was invited to call and tell the children stories before bedtime.

In 1848, Christian VIII of Denmark died and his only son Frederick acceded to the throne. Frederick was childless, had been through two unsuccessful marriages, and was assumed to be infertile. A succession crisis arose because Frederick ruled in both Denmark and Schleswig-Holstein, and the succession rules of each territory differed. In Holstein, the Salic law prevented inheritance through the female line, whereas no such restrictions applied in Denmark. Holstein, being predominantly German, proclaimed independence and called in the aid of Prussia. In 1852, the major European powers called a conference in London to discuss the Danish succession. An uneasy peace was agreed, which included the provision that Prince Christian of Schleswig-Holstein-Sonderburg-Glücksburg would be Frederick's heir in all his dominions and the prior claims of others (who included Christian's own mother-in-law, brother-in-law and wife) were surrendered.

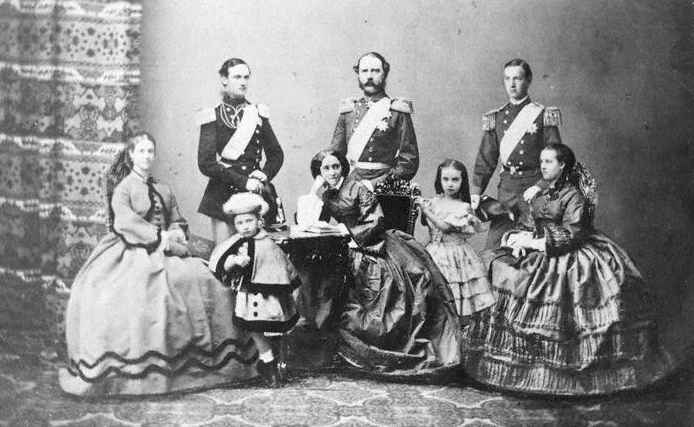
Christian IX of Denmark with his wife and their six children, 1862. Left to right: Dagmar, Frederick, Valdemar, Christian IX, Queen Louise, Thyra, William, and Alexandra.

Prince Christian was given the title Prince of Denmark and his family moved into a new official residence, Bernstorff Palace. Although the family's status had risen, there was little or no increase in their income; and they did not participate in court life in Copenhagen, for they refused to meet Frederick's third wife and former mistress, Louise Rasmussen, because she had an illegitimate child by a previous lover.

Alexandra shared a draughty attic bedroom with her sister, Dagmar, made her own clothes, and waited at table along with her sisters. Alexandra and Dagmar were given swimming lessons by the Swedish pioneer of women's swimming, Nancy Edberg. At Bernstorff, Alexandra grew into a young woman; she was taught English by the English chaplain in Copenhagen and was confirmed in Christiansborg Palace. She was devout throughout her life, and followed high church practice.

== Marriage and family ==
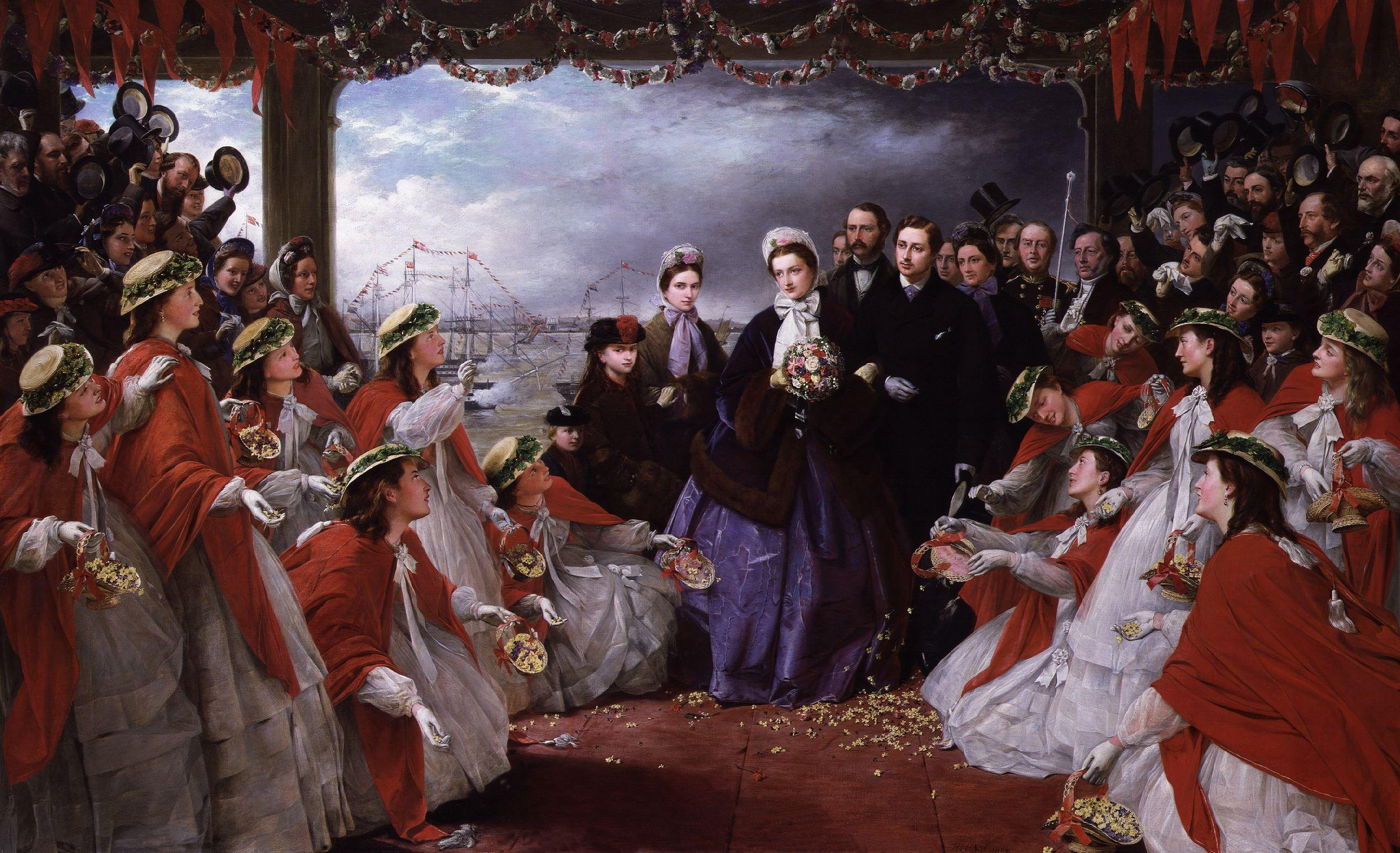
The Landing of Princess Alexandra at Gravesend, by Henry Nelson O'Neil

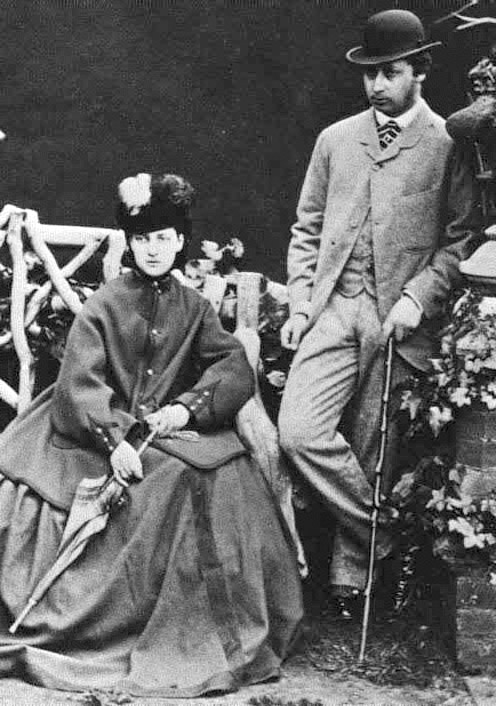
Princess Alexandra of Denmark and the Prince of Wales, 1863

Given that Albert Edward, the Prince of Wales, would reach the age of twenty in November 1861, his parents Queen Victoria and her husband, Prince Albert, were taking steps to find a bride for him. They enlisted the aid of their eldest (and already-married) daughter, Crown Princess Victoria of Prussia, in seeking a suitable candidate. Alexandra was not their first choice because the Danes were at loggerheads with the Prussians over the Schleswig-Holstein Question, and most of the British royal family's relations were German. Eventually, after rejecting other possibilities, they settled on her as "the only one to be chosen".

On 24 September 1861, Crown Princess Victoria introduced her brother Albert Edward to Alexandra at Speyer. Almost a year later on 9 September 1862 (after his affair with Nellie Clifden and the death of his father Prince Albert), Albert Edward proposed to Alexandra at the Royal Castle of Laeken, the home of his great-uncle, King Leopold I of Belgium.

A few months later, Alexandra travelled from Denmark to Britain aboard the royal yacht Victoria and Albert and arrived in Gravesend, Kent, on 7 March 1863. Sir Arthur Sullivan composed music for her arrival and Poet Laureate Alfred, Lord Tennyson, wrote an ode in Alexandra's honour:

Sea King's daughter from over the sea,
Alexandra!
Saxon and Norman and Dane are we,
But all of us Danes in our welcome of thee,
Alexandra!

— A Welcome to Alexandra, Alfred, Lord Tennyson

Thomas Longley, the Archbishop of Canterbury, married the couple on 10 March 1863 at St George's Chapel, Windsor Castle. The choice of venue was criticised. As the ceremony took place outside London, the press complained that large public crowds would not be able to view the spectacle. Prospective guests thought it awkward to get to and, as the venue was small, some people who had expected invitations were disappointed. The Danes were dismayed because only Alexandra's closest relations were invited. The British court was still in mourning for Prince Albert, so ladies were restricted to wearing grey, lilac, or mauve. As the couple left Windsor for their honeymoon at Osborne House on the Isle of Wight, they were cheered by the schoolboys of neighbouring Eton College, including Lord Randolph Churchill.

By the end of the following year, Alexandra's father had acceded to the throne of Denmark, her brother William had become King George I of Greece, her sister Dagmar was engaged to Nicholas Alexandrovich, Tsesarevich of Russia, (Note: Nicholas died within a few months of the engagement and she married his brother Alexander instead.) and Alexandra had given birth to her first child. Her father's accession gave rise to further conflict over the fate of Schleswig-Holstein. The German Confederation successfully invaded Denmark, reducing the area of Denmark by two-fifths. To the great irritation of Queen Victoria and the Crown Princess of Prussia, Alexandra and Albert Edward supported the Danish side in the war. The Prussian conquest of former Danish lands heightened Alexandra's profound dislike of the Germans, a feeling which stayed with her for the rest of her life.

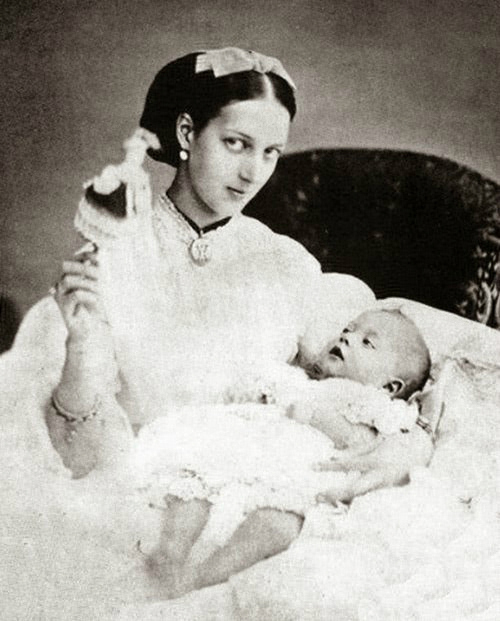
Alexandra with her firstborn child, Albert Victor, 1864

Alexandra's first child, Albert Victor, was born two months premature in early 1864. Alexandra showed devotion to her children: "She was in her glory when she could run up to the nursery, put on a flannel apron, wash the children herself and see them asleep in their little beds." Albert Edward and Alexandra had six children in total: Albert Victor, George, Louise, Victoria, Maud, and Alexander. All of Alexandra's children were apparently born prematurely; biographer Richard Hough thought Alexandra deliberately misled Queen Victoria as to her probable delivery dates, as she did not want the Queen to be present at their births. During the birth of her third child in 1867, the added complication of a bout of rheumatic fever threatened Alexandra's life and left her with a permanent limp.

In public, Alexandra was dignified and charming; in private, affectionate and jolly. She enjoyed many social activities, including dancing and ice-skating, and was an expert horsewoman and tandem driver. She also enjoyed hunting, to the dismay of Queen Victoria, who asked her to stop, but without success. Even after the birth of her first child, she continued to socialise much as before, which led to some friction between the Queen and the young couple, exacerbated by Alexandra's loathing of Prussians and the Queen's partiality towards them.

== Princess of Wales ==
Albert Edward and Alexandra visited Ireland in April 1868. After her illness the previous year, she had only just begun to walk again without the aid of two walking sticks, and was already pregnant with her fourth child. The royal couple undertook a six-month tour taking in Austria, Egypt and Greece over 1868 and 1869, which included visits to her brother George I of Greece, to the Crimean battlefields and, for her only, to the harem of the Khedive Ismail. In Turkey she became the first woman to sit down to dinner with the Sultan (Abdulaziz).

The couple made Sandringham House their preferred residence, with Marlborough House their London base. Biographers agree that their marriage was in many ways a happy one; however, some have asserted that Albert Edward did not give his wife as much attention as she would have liked and that they gradually became estranged, until his attack of typhoid fever (the disease which was believed to have killed his father) in late 1871 brought about a reconciliation. This is disputed by others, who point out Alexandra's frequent pregnancies throughout this period and use family letters to deny the existence of any serious rift. Nevertheless, the prince was severely criticised from many quarters of society for his apparent lack of interest in her very serious illness with rheumatic fever. Throughout their marriage Albert Edward continued to keep company with other women, including the actress Lillie Langtry, Daisy Greville, Countess of Warwick, humanitarian Agnes Keyser, and society matron Alice Keppel. Alexandra knew about most of these relationships and later permitted Alice Keppel to visit her husband as he lay dying. Alexandra herself remained faithful throughout her marriage.

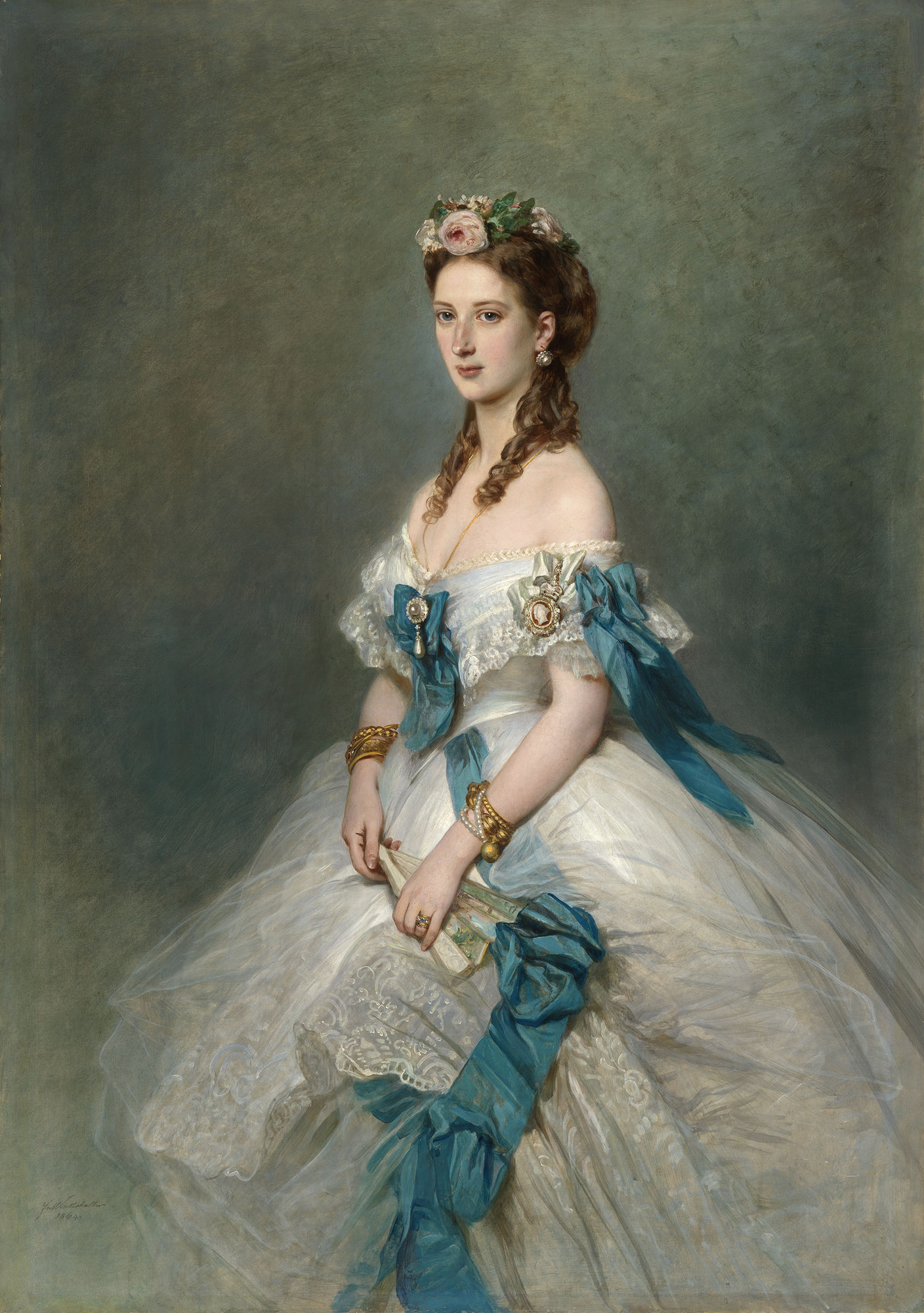
Portrait of Alexandra of Denmark by Franz Xaver Winterhalter, 1864

An increasing degree of deafness, caused by hereditary otosclerosis, led to Alexandra's social isolation; she spent more time at home with her children and pets. Her sixth and final pregnancy ended with the birth of her son, Alexander John in April 1871, but the infant died the next day. Despite Alexandra's pleas for privacy, Queen Victoria insisted on announcing a period of court mourning, which led unsympathetic elements of the press to describe the birth as "a wretched abortion" and the funeral arrangements as "sickening mummery", even though the infant was not buried in state with other members of the royal family at Windsor, but in strict privacy in the churchyard at Sandringham, where he had lived out his brief life.

For eight months over 1875–76, Albert Edward was absent from Britain on a tour of India, but to her dismay Alexandra was left behind. The prince had planned an all-male group and intended to spend much of the time hunting and shooting. During his tour, one of Albert Edward's friends who was travelling with him, Lord Aylesford, was told by his wife that she was going to leave him for another man, Lord Blandford, who was himself married. Aylesford was appalled and decided to seek a divorce.

Meanwhile, Lord Blandford's brother, Lord Randolph Churchill, persuaded the lovers against an elopement. Now concerned by the threat of divorce, Lady Aylesford sought to dissuade her husband from proceeding, but Lord Aylesford was adamant and refused to reconsider. In an attempt to pressure Lord Aylesford to drop his divorce suit, Lady Aylesford and Lord Randolph Churchill called on Alexandra and told her that if the divorce was to proceed they would subpoena her husband as a witness and implicate him in the scandal. Distressed at their threats, and following the advice of Sir William Knollys and the Duchess of Teck, Alexandra informed the Queen, who then wrote to the Prince of Wales. The prince was incensed. Eventually, the Blandfords and the Aylesfords both separated privately. Although Lord Randolph Churchill later apologised, for years afterwards the Prince of Wales refused to speak to or see him.

Alexandra spent the spring of 1877 in Greece recuperating from a period of ill health and visiting her brother King George of Greece. During the Russo-Turkish War, Alexandra was clearly partial against Turkey and towards Russia, where her sister was married to the Tsarevitch, and she lobbied for a revision of the border between Greece and Turkey in favour of the Greeks. Alexandra spent the next three years largely parted from her two sons as the boys were sent on a worldwide cruise as part of their naval and general education. The farewell was very tearful and, as shown by her regular letters, she missed them terribly. In 1881, Alexandra and Albert Edward travelled to Saint Petersburg after the assassination of Alexander II of Russia, both to represent Britain and so that Alexandra could provide comfort to her sister, who had become tsarina.

Alexandra undertook many public duties; in the words of Queen Victoria, "to spare me the strain and fatigue of functions. She opens bazaars, attends concerts, visits hospitals in my place ... she not only never complains, but endeavours to prove that she has enjoyed what to another would be a tiresome duty." She took a particular interest in the London Hospital, visiting it regularly. Joseph Merrick, the so-called "Elephant Man", was one of the patients whom she met. Crowds usually cheered Alexandra rapturously, but during a visit to Ireland in 1885, she suffered a rare moment of public hostility when visiting the City of Cork, a hotbed of Irish nationalism. She and her husband were booed by a crowd of two to three thousand people brandishing sticks and black flags. She smiled her way through the ordeal, which the British press still portrayed in a positive light, describing the crowds as "enthusiastic". As part of the same visit, she received a Doctorate in Music from Trinity College Dublin.

Alexandra was deeply saddened by the death of her eldest son, Prince Albert Victor, in 1892. His room and possessions were kept exactly as he had left them, much as those of his grandfather Prince Albert were left after his death in 1861. Alexandra said, "I have buried my angel and with him my happiness." Surviving letters between Alexandra and her children indicate that they were mutually devoted. In 1894, her brother-in-law Alexander III of Russia died and her nephew Nicholas II became Tsar. Alexandra's widowed sister, Dowager Empress Maria of Russia, leant heavily on her for support; Alexandra, who had gone to Russia accompanied by her husband, slept, prayed, and stayed beside Maria for the next two weeks until Alexander's burial. Alexandra and Albert Edward stayed on for the wedding of Nicholas to their niece Princess Alix of Hesse and by Rhine, who had taken the Russian name Alexandra Feodorovna and became the new tsarina.

== Queen and empress consort ==
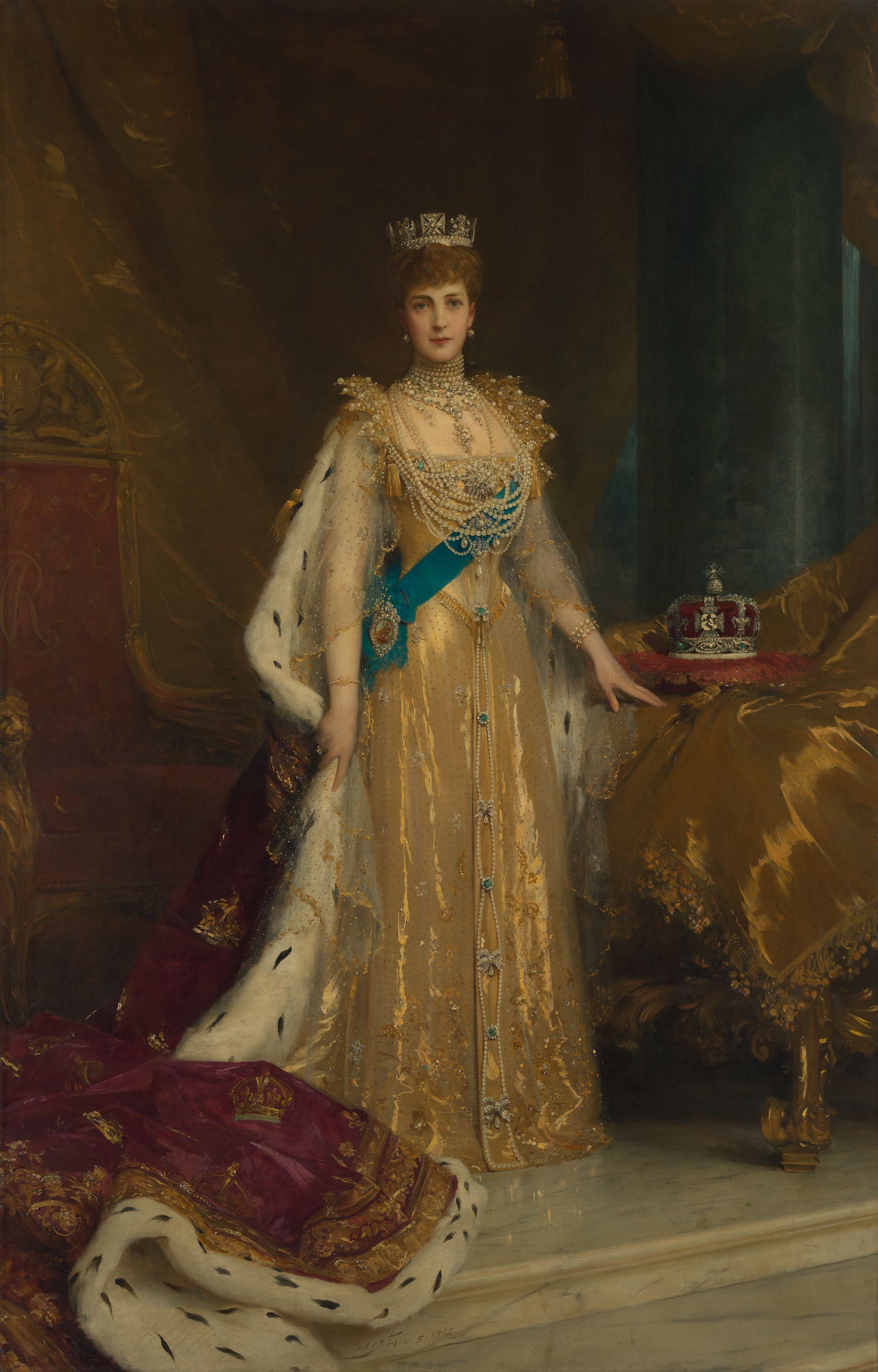
Coronation portrait by Luke Fildes, 1905

With the death of her mother-in-law, Queen Victoria, in 1901, Alexandra became queen-empress with her husband's accession as Edward VII. Just two months later, her son George and daughter-in-law Mary left on an extensive tour of the empire, leaving their young children in the care of Alexandra and Edward, who doted on their grandchildren. On George's return, preparations for Edward and Alexandra's coronation in Westminster Abbey were well in hand, but just a few days before the scheduled coronation in June 1902, the King became seriously ill with appendicitis. Alexandra deputised for him at a military parade and attended the Royal Ascot races without him, in an attempt to prevent public alarm. Eventually, the coronation had to be postponed and Edward had an operation performed by Frederick Treves of the London Hospital to drain the infected appendix. After his recovery, Alexandra and Edward were crowned together in August: the King by the Archbishop of Canterbury, Frederick Temple, and the Queen by the Archbishop of York, William Dalrymple Maclagan.

Despite being queen, Alexandra's duties changed little, and she kept many of the same retainers. Alexandra's Woman of the Bedchamber, Charlotte Knollys, the daughter of Sir William Knollys, served Alexandra loyally for many years. On 10 December 1903, Knollys woke to find her bedroom full of smoke. She roused Alexandra and shepherded her to safety. In the words of Grand Duchess Augusta of Mecklenburg-Strelitz, "We must give credit to old Charlotte for really saving [Alexandra's] life."

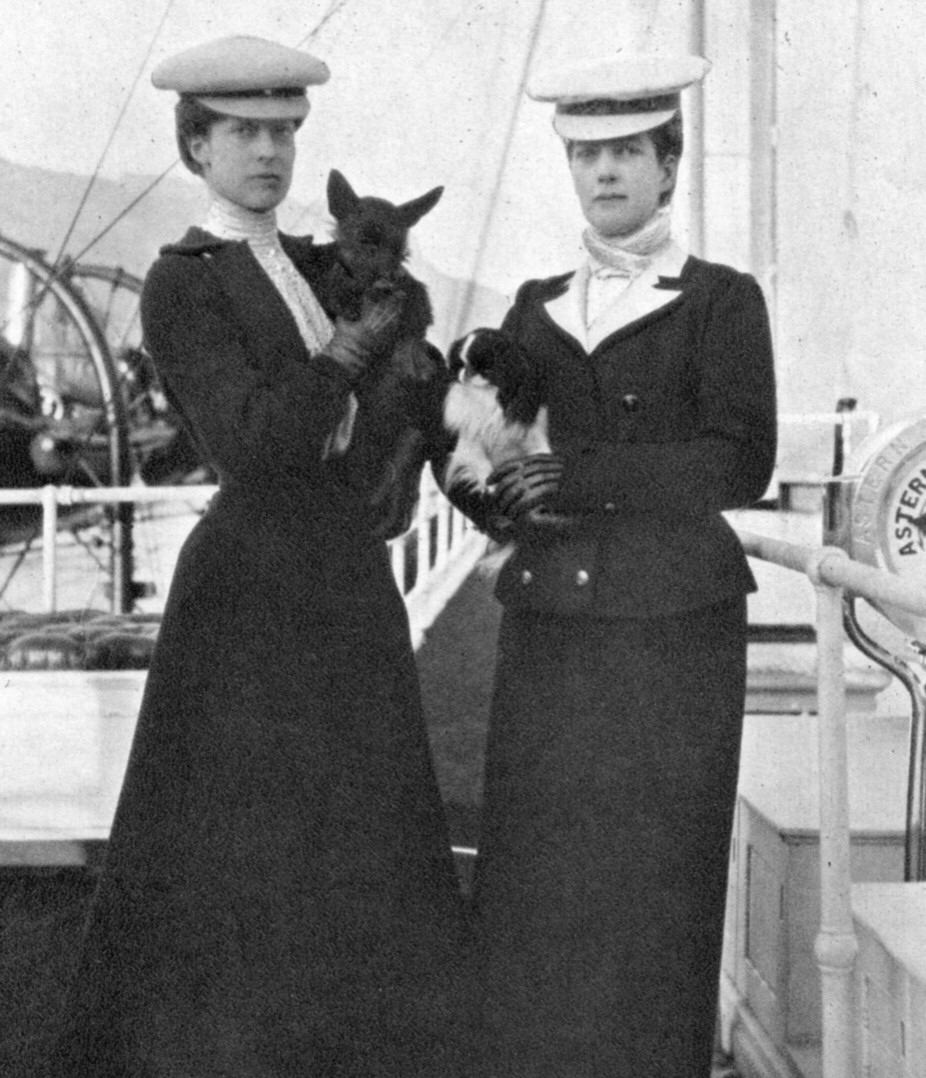
Alexandra (right) was an enthusiastic amateur photographer. This photograph of her with her daughter Victoria is from Queen Alexandra's Christmas gift book, which was published in 1908 to raise money for charities.

Alexandra again looked after her grandchildren when George and Mary went on a second tour, this time to British India, over the winter of 1905–06. Her father, Christian IX of Denmark, died that January. Eager to retain their family links, both to each other and to Denmark, in 1907 Alexandra and her sister, Dowager Empress Maria, purchased a villa north of Copenhagen, Hvidøre, as a private getaway.

Alexandra was denied access to the King's briefing papers and excluded from some of his foreign tours to prevent her meddling in diplomatic matters. She was deeply distrustful of Germans, particularly her nephew German Emperor Wilhelm II, and she invariably opposed anything that favoured German expansion or interests. For example, in 1890 Alexandra wrote a memorandum, distributed to senior British ministers and military personnel, warning against the planned exchange of the British North Sea island of Heligoland for the German colony of Zanzibar, pointing out Heligoland's strategic significance and that it could be used either by Germany to launch an attack, or by Britain to contain German aggression. Despite this, the exchange went ahead. The Germans fortified the island and, in the words of Robert Ensor and as Alexandra had predicted, it "became the keystone of Germany's maritime position for offence as well as for defence". The Frankfurter Zeitung was outspoken in its condemnation of Alexandra and her sister Maria, saying that the pair were "the centre of the international anti-German conspiracy". Alexandra despised and distrusted Emperor Wilhelm, calling him "inwardly our enemy" in 1900.

In 1910, Alexandra became the first queen consort to visit the British House of Commons during a debate. In a remarkable departure from precedent, for two hours she sat in the Ladies' Gallery overlooking the chamber while the Parliament Bill, to remove the right of the House of Lords to veto legislation, was debated. Privately, Alexandra disagreed with the bill. Shortly afterwards, she left to visit her brother George in Corfu. While there, she received news that King Edward was seriously ill. Alexandra returned at once and arrived only the day before her husband died. In his last hours, she personally administered oxygen from a gas cylinder to help him breathe. She told Frederick Ponsonby, "I feel as if I had been turned into stone, unable to cry, unable to grasp the meaning of it all." Later that year she moved out of Buckingham Palace to Marlborough House, but she retained possession of Sandringham. The new king, Alexandra's son George V, soon faced a decision over the Parliament Bill. Despite her personal views, Alexandra supported her son's reluctant agreement to Prime Minister H. H. Asquith's request to create sufficient Liberal peers after a general election if the Lords continued to block the legislation.

== Queen mother ==
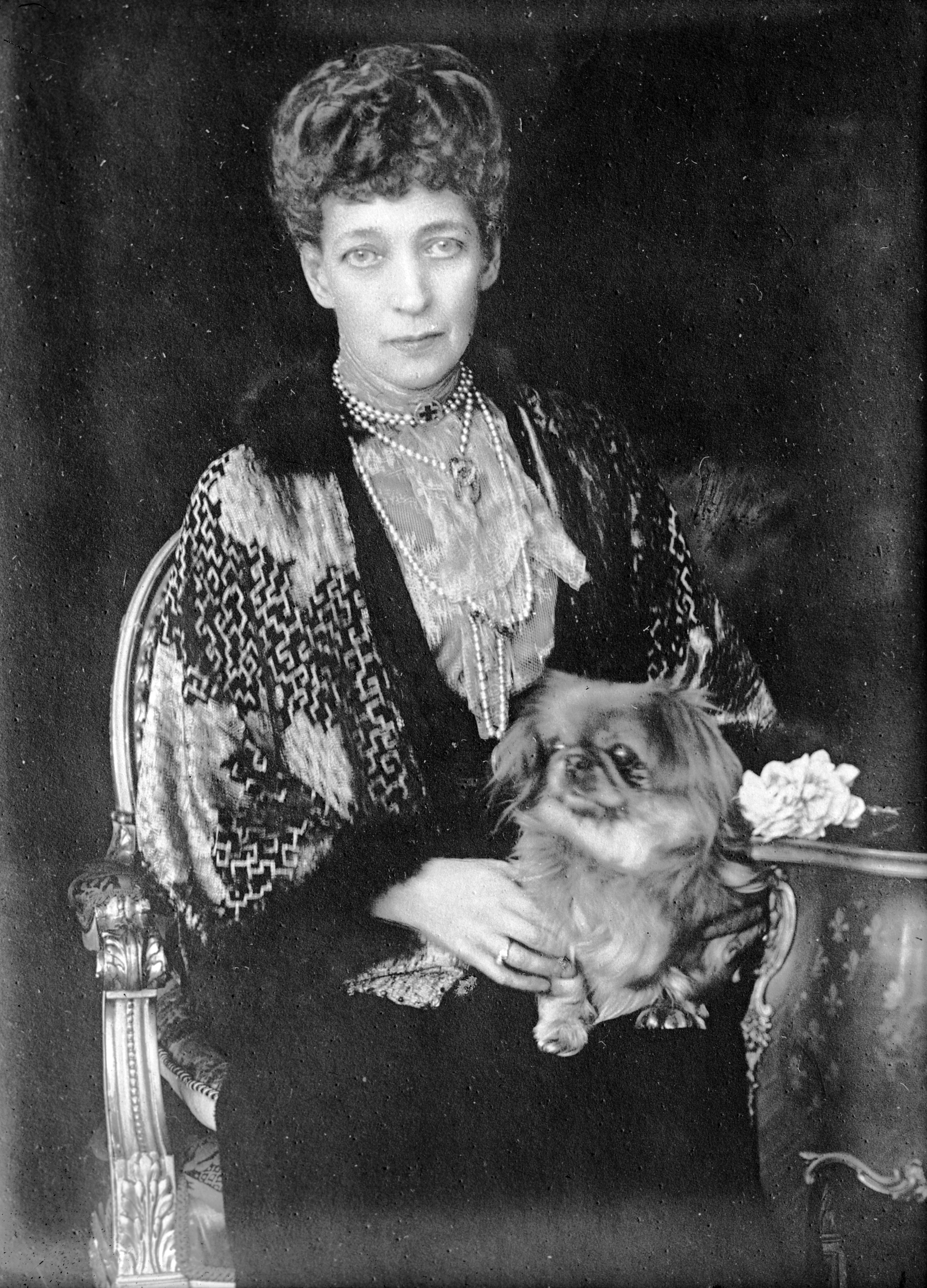
Queen Alexandra, 1923

From Edward's death, Alexandra was queen mother, being a dowager queen and the mother of the reigning monarch. She did not attend the coronation of her son and daughter-in-law in 1911 since it was not customary for a crowned queen to attend the coronation of another king or queen, but otherwise continued the public side of her life, devoting time to her charitable causes. One such cause was Alexandra Rose Day, where artificial roses made by people with disabilities were sold in aid of hospitals by women volunteers. (Note: The Alexandra Rose Day fund still exists; its patron is Princess Alexandra, The Honourable Lady Ogilvy, Alexandra's great-granddaughter.) During the First World War the custom of hanging the banners of foreign princes invested with Britain's highest order of knighthood, the Order of the Garter, in St George's Chapel, Windsor Castle, came under criticism, as the German members of the Order were fighting against Britain. Alexandra joined calls to "have down those hateful German banners". Driven by public opinion, but against his own wishes, the King had the banners removed; but to Alexandra's dismay, he had taken down not only "those vile Prussian banners" but also those of her Hessian relations who were, in her opinion, "simply soldiers or vassals under that brutal German Emperor's orders". On 17 September 1916, she was at Sandringham during a Zeppelin air raid, but far worse was to befall other members of her family. In Russia, her nephew Tsar Nicholas II was overthrown and he, his wife and their children were killed by revolutionaries. Dowager Empress Maria was rescued from Russia in 1919 by HMS Marlborough and brought to England, where she lived for some time with her sister Alexandra.

=== Last years and death ===
Alexandra retained a youthful appearance into her senior years, but during the war her age caught up with her. She took to wearing elaborate veils and heavy makeup, which was described by gossips as having her face "enamelled". She made no more trips abroad, and her health worsened. In 1920, a blood vessel in her eye burst, leaving her with temporary partial blindness. Towards the end of her life, her memory and speech became impaired.

Alexandra died from a heart attack at Sandringham House at 5:25 pm on 20 November 1925, aged 80. Her funeral service was held at Westminster Abbey on 27 November, after which she lay in state there. The following day she was interred beside her husband in St George's Chapel, Windsor Castle.

== Legacy ==
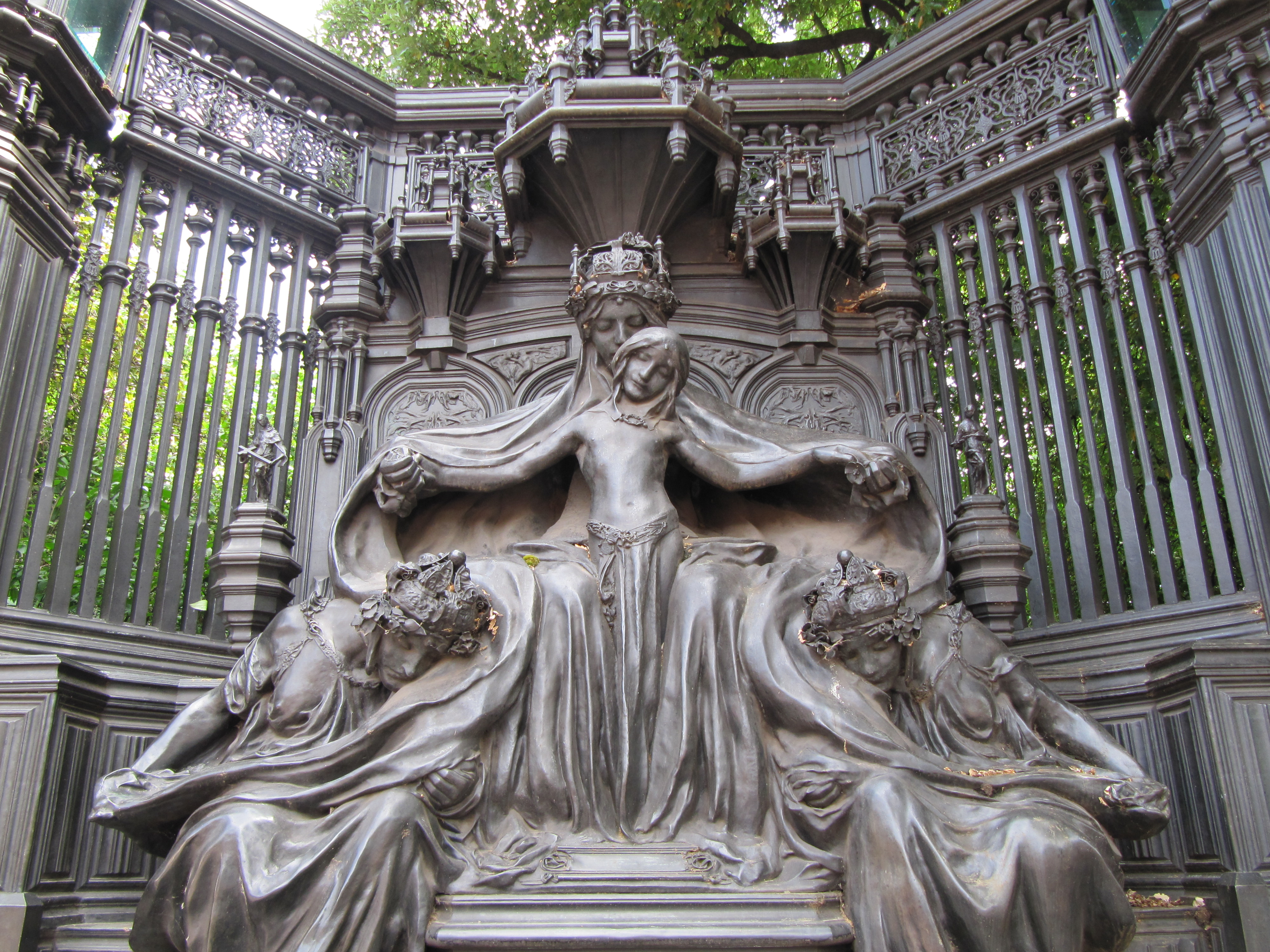
Detail of the Queen Alexandra Memorial, opposite St James's Palace

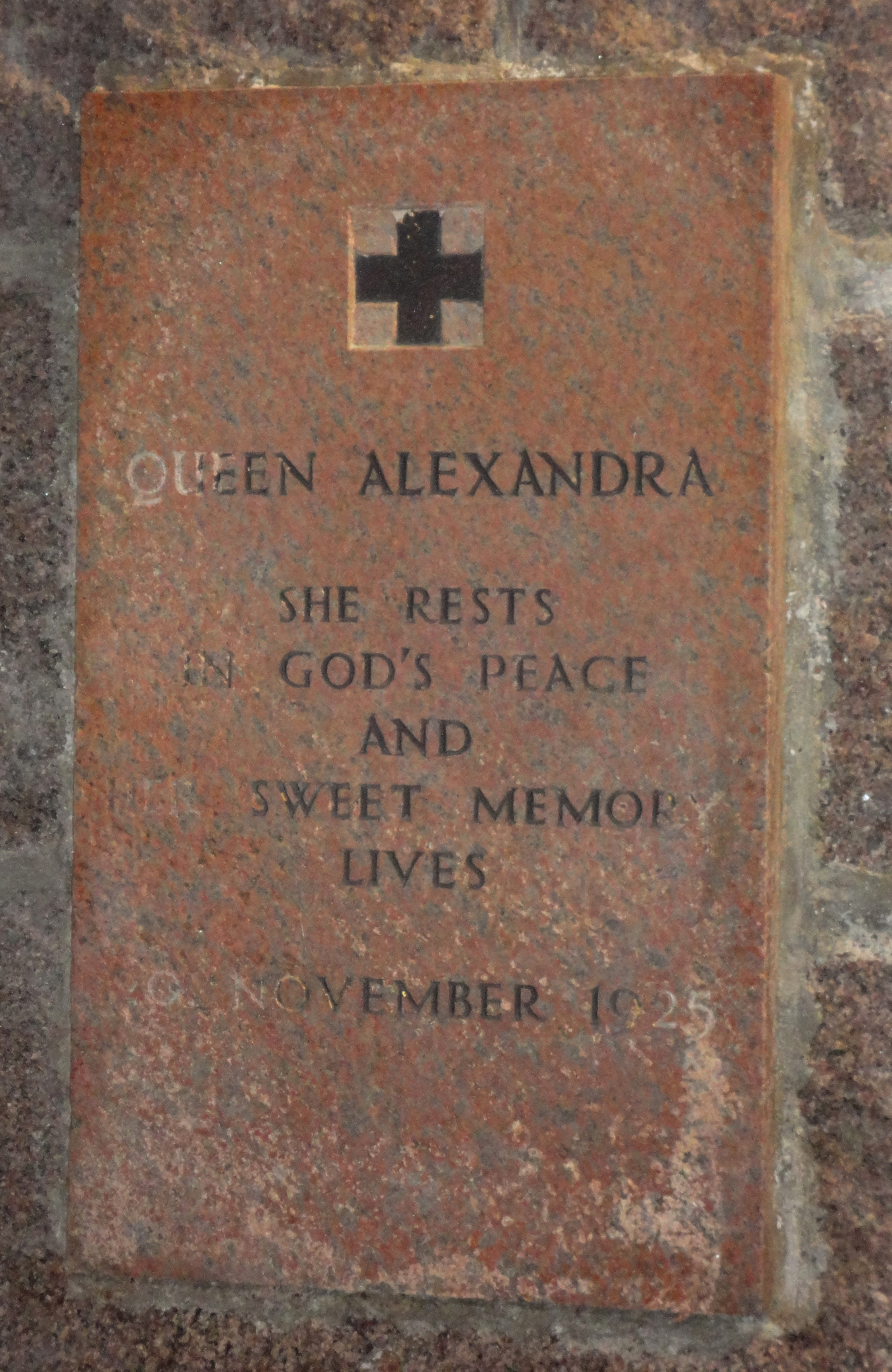
Wall-mounted plaque for Queen Alexandra in St Ninian's Chapel, Braemar, where her eldest daughter is buried

The Queen Alexandra Memorial by Alfred Gilbert was unveiled on Alexandra Rose Day 8 June 1932 at Marlborough Gate, London. An ode in her memory, "So many true princesses who have gone", composed by the then Master of the King's Musick Sir Edward Elgar to words by the Poet Laureate John Masefield, was sung at the unveiling and conducted by the composer.

The football club Crewe Alexandra, based in Cheshire and founded in 1877, is named in her honour.

Alexandra was highly popular with the British public. Unlike her husband and mother-in-law, Alexandra was not castigated by the press. Funds that she helped to collect were used to buy a river launch, called Alexandra, to ferry the wounded during the Sudan campaign, and to fit out a hospital ship, named The Princess of Wales, to bring back wounded from the Boer War. During the Boer War, Queen Alexandra's Imperial Military Nursing Service, later renamed Queen Alexandra's Royal Army Nursing Corps, was founded under Royal Warrant.

Alexandra had little understanding of money. The management of her finances was left in the hands of her loyal comptroller, Sir Dighton Probyn VC, who undertook a similar role for her husband. In the words of her grandson, Edward VIII (later the Duke of Windsor), "Her generosity was a source of embarrassment to her financial advisers. Whenever she received a letter soliciting money, a cheque would be sent by the next post, regardless of the authenticity of the mendicant and without having the case investigated." Though she was not always extravagant (she had her old stockings darned for re-use and her old dresses were recycled as furniture covers), she would dismiss protests about her heavy spending with a wave of a hand or by claiming that she had not heard.

Alexandra hid a small scar on her neck, which was probably the result of a childhood operation, by wearing choker necklaces and high necklines, setting fashions which were adopted for fifty years. Alexandra's effect on fashion was so profound that society ladies even copied her limping gait, after her serious illness in 1867 left her with a stiff leg. This came to be known as the "Alexandra limp". She used predominantly the London fashion houses; her favourite was Redfern's, but she shopped occasionally at Doucet and Fromont of Paris.

Alexandra has been portrayed on television by Deborah Grant and Helen Ryan in Edward the Seventh, Ann Firbank in Lillie, Maggie Smith in All the King's Men, and Bibi Andersson in The Lost Prince. She was portrayed in film by Helen Ryan again in the 1980 film The Elephant Man, Sara Stewart in the 1997 film Mrs Brown, and Julia Blake in the 1999 film Passion. In a 1980 stage play by Royce Ryton, Motherdear, she was portrayed by Margaret Lockwood in her last acting role. Also, in 1907, the Royal Alexandra Theatre was built in Toronto, Canada, as North America's first royal theatre. The venue was named after her, after a patent letter was granted by the King, her husband Edward VII.

== Honours ==
British

- Member 1st Class of the Royal Order of Victoria and Albert, 1863
- Dame of Justice of the Most Venerable Order of the Hospital of Saint John of Jerusalem, 1876
- Companion of the Imperial Order of the Crown of India, 8 January 1878
- Royal Lady of the Most Noble Order of the Garter, 12 February 1901
- Dame Grand Cross of the Most Excellent Order of the British Empire, 1 January 1918

She was the first woman since 1488 to be made a Lady of the Garter.

Foreign

- Kingdom of Portugal: Dame of the Order of Queen Saint Isabel, 23 June 1863
- Russian Empire: Grand Cross of the Imperial Order of Saint Catherine, 25 May 1865
- Kingdom of Spain: Dame of the Order of Queen Maria Luisa, 11 February 1872
- Kingdom of Prussia: Dame of the Order of Louise, 1st Division, 1886
- Grand Duchy of Hesse: Dame of the Grand Ducal Hessian Order of the Golden Lion, 1 July 1889
- Empire of Japan: Grand Cordon of the Order of the Precious Crown, June 1902
- Persian Empire: Member 1st Class of the Imperial Order of the Sun for Ladies, June 1902
- Ottoman Empire: Grand Cordon of the Order of Charity, June 1902
- Austro-Hungarian Empire: Grand Cross of the Imperial Austrian Order of Elizabeth, in Brilliants, 1904

== Arms ==
Queen Alexandra's arms upon the accession of her husband in 1901 were the royal coat of arms of the United Kingdom impaled with the arms of her father, the King of Denmark. The shield is surmounted by the imperial crown, and supported by the crowned lion of England and a wild man or savage from the Danish royal arms.

Coat of arms of Alexandra, Princess of Wales

Coat of arms of Queen Alexandra

As a Lady of the Garter, Alexandra's banner of arms hung in St George's Chapel, Windsor Castle, during her lifetime despite the objections of Garter Principal King of Arms Sir Albert Woods. When Woods complained that placing her banner in the chapel would be unprecedented, "the King promptly ordered the banner to be put up."

Royal cypher of Queen Alexandra

== Issue ==
Name	Birth	Death	Marriage/notes
Prince Albert Victor, Duke of Clarence and Avondale	8 January 1864	14 January 1892 (aged 28)	engaged 1891, to Princess Victoria Mary of Teck
George V	3 June 1865	20 January 1936 (aged 70)	1893, Princess Victoria Mary of Teck; had issue including Edward VIII and George VI
Louise, Princess Royal	20 February 1867	4 January 1931 (aged 63)	1889, Alexander Duff, 1st Duke of Fife; had issue
Princess Victoria	6 July 1868	3 December 1935 (aged 67)	never married and without issue
Princess Maud	26 November 1869	20 November 1938 (aged 68)	1896, Prince Carl of Denmark (King of Norway as Haakon VII from 1905); had one child Prince Alexander (later Olav V)
Prince Alexander John of Wales	6 April 1871	7 April 1871	Born and died at Sandringham House

== Ancestry ==
Ancestors of Alexandra of Denmark

8. Frederick Charles Louis, Duke of Schleswig-Holstein-Sonderburg-Beck
4. Frederick William, Duke of Schleswig-Holstein-Sonderburg-Glücksburg
9. Countess Friederike von Schlieben
2. Christian IX, King of Denmark
10. Prince Charles of Hesse-Kassel
5. Princess Louise Caroline of Hesse-Kassel
11. Princess Louise of Denmark
1. Alexandra of Denmark
12. Prince Frederick of Hesse-Kassel
6. Prince William of Hesse-Kassel
13. Princess Caroline of Nassau-Usingen
3. Princess Louise of Hesse-Kassel
14. Frederick, Hereditary Prince of Denmark
7. Princess Charlotte of Denmark
15. Duchess Sophia Frederica of Mecklenburg-Schwerin

== See also ==
- Crown of Queen Alexandra
- Household of Edward VII and Alexandra

== Notes ==
Alexandra of Denmark House of Schleswig-Holstein-Sonderburg-Glücksburg Cadet branch of the House of Oldenburg Born: 1 December 1844 Died: 20 November 1925
Royal titles
Vacant Title last held by Albert of Saxe-Coburg and Gotha as prince consort	Queen consort of the United Kingdom; 1901–1910	Succeeded by Mary of Teck
New title	Empress consort of India; 1901–1910	Succeeded by Mary of Teck
