= Nellie Clifden =

Actor and briefly girlfriend of Edward, Prince of Wales

Nellie Clifden was a nineteenth-century actress, believed to be of Irish extraction. She is known for her brief sexual relationship with the 19-year-old Albert Edward, Prince of Wales (Bertie), prior to his marriage to Princess Alexandra of Denmark.

Clifden met the young prince at a party in England and again when he was spending 10 weeks at Curragh Camp in Ireland with the Grenadier Guards in the late summer of 1861; he had previously been a sexual novice. While they were at Cambridge, Charles Carrington arranged for a liaison with Clifden. Guards officers later brought her to Ireland from England for the same purpose, and coded notes in the Prince's appointment book refer to trysts with "NC" on 6, 9, and 11 September 1861. The relationship may have lasted longer.

Information about the events reached the Prince's parents. His father Prince Albert duly visited his son at Cambridge, where they took a long walk in the rain, presumably to discuss the Prince's behaviour. Prince Albert's biographer Jules Stewart, says that Albert had lost faith in his son.

Prince Albert died soon after, and Queen Victoria attributed her husband's death to his worry over his son's conduct, particularly Bertie's "fall" at Curragh Camp; Albert had died of a broken heart, she incorrectly believed. She was also quoted as saying that Albert had been "killed by that dreadful business." At the time he was thought to have died of typhoid fever, but more recent research suggests that Albert actually died from complications of Crohn's disease.

The Prince of Wales's affair with Clifden resumed after his return to London, which gave rise to gossip and scandal, but did not last long.

He wrote to Carrington from Constantinople, while on an official tour in spring 1862: "I am sorry to see by your letter that you still keep up an acquaintance with NC [Nelly Clifden], as I had hoped that by this time that that was over". During his foreign tour, the Royal Family planned his marriage to Alexandra of Denmark, which took place in 1863.

Nothing is known of Clifden's later life.
