= Richard Dorment =

British art historian and critic (born 1946)

Richard Dorment CBE, FSA
- Born: 1946 (age 79–80); United States
- Education: Princeton University, Columbia University
- Occupations: Art critic, author

Richard Dorment, CBE, FSA (born 1946) is a British art historian and exhibition organiser. He worked as chief art critic for The Daily Telegraph from 1986 until 2015.

== Early life ==
Dorment was born in the United States in 1946. He graduated in 1968 cum laude from Princeton University, where he studied art history. His post-graduate work was at Columbia University, where he was a faculty fellow from 1968 until 1972. He completed his doctorate at Columbia University in 1975 with a dissertation on Edward Burne-Jones's mosaics for the American Church in Rome.

== Career ==
Dorment worked as assistant curator in the department of European painting at the Philadelphia Museum of Art. He then moved to London where he wrote a Catalogue of British Painting in the Philadelphia Museum of Art in 1986 and a biography of the British sculptor Alfred Gilbert. He became chief art critic for The Daily Telegraph in 1986. After his retirement in 2015, he published a collection of his reviews entitled Exhibitionist: Writing about Art for a Daily Newspaper in 2016.

In 1989, Dorment served on the judging panel for the Turner Prize. He has also been a member of the Advisory Committee of the Government Art Collection, a member of the Reviewing Committee on the Export of Works of Art, and a member of the British Council's Advisory Committee for the Visual Arts. He was a trustee of the Wallace Collection and has been a trustee of the Watts Gallery since 1996. Dorment is a contributor for The New York Review of Books, and has also written for The Burlington Magazine, The Times Literary Supplement, and Literary Review.

In 2009, he wrote the first of a series of articles in The New York Review of Books calling into question the methods and decisions of the Andy Warhol Foundation's Art Authentication Board. In 2011, the chairman of the Andy Warhol Foundation's board of directors announced that the Art Authentication Board would close. The following year, the Foundation announced it would be selling the Warhol works it owned.

=== Exhibitions ===
In 1994 until 1995, Dorment was a co-curator for the James McNeill Whistler exhibition at the Tate Gallery. He curated the Alfred Gilbert: Sculptor and Goldsmith exhibit at the Royal Academy of Arts in 1986. He contributed to the Victorian High Renaissance exhibition catalogue in 1978.

== Honours and awards ==
Dorment was elected a Fellow of the Society of Antiquaries of London (FSA) in 2013. In the 2014 New Year Honours, he was appointed a Commander of the Order of the British Empire (CBE) "for services to the arts".

Dorment won the Hawthornden Prize for Art Criticism in Great Britain in 1992, in 2000 he was named Critic of the Year in the British Press Awards, and in 2014 his review of the reopening of the Rijksmuseum won the Holland Prize.

== Personal life ==
Dorment married the novelist Harriet Waugh in 1985 and has two children from a previous marriage.

== Selected publications ==
- Richard Dorment (2023). Warhol after Warhol. Picador. ISBN 978-1529081497.
- Richard Dorment (2016). Exhibitionist: Writing about Art for a Daily Newspaper. Bitter Lemon Press. ISBN 978-1908524676.
- Richard Dorment, Margaret McDonald (1995). James McNeill Whistler. Harry N Abrams. ISBN 0810939762.
- Richard Dorment (September 1986). British Painting in the Philadelphia Museum of Art: From the seventeenth through the nineteenth century. ISBN 0812280350.
- Richard Dorment (1986). Alfred Gilbert, Sculptor and Goldsmith. Royal Academy catalogue. ISBN 0297788760.
- Richard Dorment (10 September 1986). Alfred Gilbert. Yale University Press. ISBN 0300033885.
