= Alfred Gilbert =

British sculptor

Alfred Gilbert RA
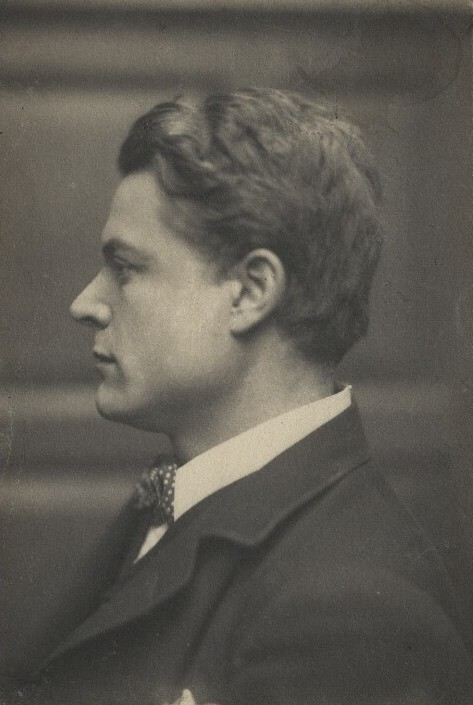
- Portrait by Frederick Hollyer (1887)
- Born: 12 August 1854; London, England
- Died: 4 November 1934 (aged 80); London, England
- Education: Thomas J. Heatherley School of Art; Royal Academy Schools; École des Beaux-Arts
- Occupation: Sculptor
- Years active: 1878–1932
- Era: Victorian
- Notable work: Shaftesbury Memorial Fountain, Tomb of Prince Albert Victor, Queen Alexandra Memorial
- Spouses: Alice Jane Gilbert; Stéphanie Quaghebeur
- Children: 5, including Caprina Fahey

Sir Alfred Gilbert RA (12 August 1854 – 4 November 1934) was an English sculptor. He was born in London and studied sculpture under Joseph Boehm, Matthew Noble, Édouard Lantéri and Pierre-Jules Cavelier. His first work of importance was The Kiss of Victory, followed by the trilogy of Perseus Arming, Icarus and Comedy and Tragedy. His most creative years were from the late 1880s to the mid-1890s, when he produced several celebrated works such as a memorial for the Golden Jubilee of Queen Victoria and the Shaftesbury Memorial Fountain Anteros on Piccadilly Circus.

As well as sculpture, Gilbert explored other techniques such as goldsmithing and damascening. He painted watercolours and drew book illustrations. He was made a member of the Royal Academy of Arts in 1892, yet his personal life was beginning to unravel as he took on too many commissions and entered into debt, whilst at the same time his wife's mental health deteriorated. Gilbert received a royal commission for the tomb of Prince Albert Victor in 1892, but was unable to finish it and the number of complaints from other dissatisfied clients grew. By the mid-1900s, Gilbert had been forced to declare himself bankrupt and to resign from the Royal Academy. He moved to Bruges in disgrace and separated from his wife. He later remarried, entering a period when he created few artworks.

In the 1920s, his career was rehabilitated with the help of journalist Isabel McAllister. He returned to England and finally completed the tomb of Prince Albert Victor, as well as taking on new commissions such as the Queen Alexandra Memorial. In 1932, Gilbert was reinstated as a member of the Royal Academy and was also knighted. He died in 1934, at the age of 80. Gilbert was a central inspiration for the New Sculpture movement and in the 21st-century is regarded as one of the foremost sculptors of the Victorian age.

== Early life ==
Alfred Gilbert was born 12 August 1854 at 13 Berners Street, near Oxford Street in central London. He was the eldest child of Charlotte Cole and Alfred Gilbert, who were both musicians. Berners Street was at that time an area popular with artists and musicians: there were shops selling stained glass, carvings, printings and bronze artworks; Ford Madox Brown and Edward Hodges Baily had studios; Leigh's Academy (run by James Mathews Leigh) was nearby, later becoming the Thomas J. Heatherley School of Art. Gilbert first attended William Kemshead's Academy for a few months in 1863, which was a naval school near Portsmouth. He then went to the Mercers' School in the City of London, afterwards switching to Aldenham School in Hertfordshire, where his father taught music. Gilbert later commented that "I always hated school". He enjoyed more spending time with his paternal grandfather, who taught him how to woodwork. At Aldenham, Gilbert began to make portraits of his schoolfellows with clay he took from ditches and the headmaster Alfred Leeman was encouraging, to the extent that Gilbert made a full-length seated portrait of him in 1872.

Gilbert's father pushed him to become a surgeon, so he applied to the Royal College of Surgeons and was accepted in 1872. He then went for a scholarship at Middlesex Hospital to work as a surgeon and was rejected, allowing him to pursue his true interest of sculpture. Studying first at the Thomas J. Heatherley School from 1872 until 1873, afterwards he went to the Royal Academy Schools from 1873 until 1875. His fellow students included Frank Dicksee, Johnston Forbes-Robertson, John Macallan Swan, Hamo Thornycroft and J. W. Waterhouse. Eager to learn, he also worked in the studios of Sir Joseph Boehm, Matthew Noble, and William Gibbs Rogers. Gilbert later credited Boehm and his assistant Édouard Lantéri as his true teachers.

Gilbert travelled to Paris to study at the École des Beaux-Arts under Pierre-Jules Cavelier. He had fallen in love with his first cousin, Alice Jane Gilbert, and they were forced to elope. In Paris they lived first at the Hôtel l'Artesian at Place de la Madeleine and then at 17 rue Humboldt. Gilbert returned to England in April 1878 to be at the deathbed of his younger brother Gordon, who succumbed to tuberculosis at the age of 20. Later that year, Gilbert moved to Rome with his wife and two young children. They lived at 63 Vicolo de'Miracoli, experiencing money problems as Gilbert waited to be paid for commissions whilst also having to pay rent. By 1881, Gilbert was splitting his time between a new studio space at 18 Via San Basilio in Rome and Capri. He returned to England in 1884.

== Career ==
=== Early works ===
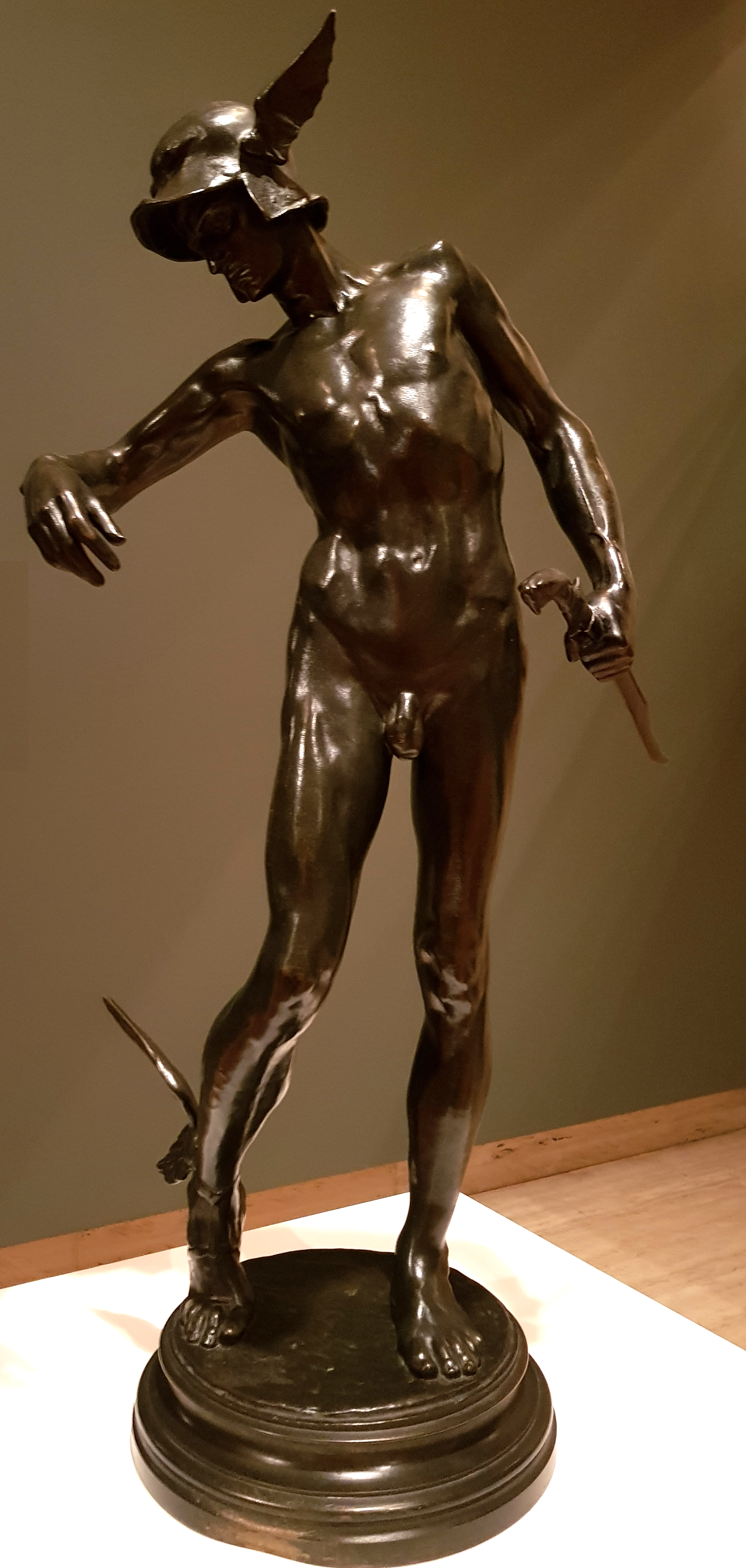
Perseus Arming, an inspiration for the New Sculpture movement

Gilbert's first work of importance was The Kiss of Victory (1878–1881), which depicted a Roman soldier dying in the arms of Victory. He moved with his family to Rome in order to create the sculpture in marble, attracted by famed sculptors of the Renaissance such as Cellini, Donatello, Giambologna and Verrocchio. It was exhibited at the Royal Academy of Arts in 1882.

Perseus Arming (1882) was inspired by a visit to Florence and influenced by Donatello's David and Cellini's Perseus with the Head of Medusa. It was Gilbert's first statue made in bronze. The work was acclaimed and led Frederic Leighton to commission Icarus (1884), which was exhibited at the Royal Academy in 1884, along with Study of a Head (1882–83). Gilbert also created The Enchanted Chair (c. 1885), only to destroy it again. He was commissioned by the Baroness von Fahnenberg to design a mausoleum in Spa, Belgium, Belgium but she died without having signed a final agreement, leading him to sue for compensation.

Gilbert later stated to Joseph Hatton that the bronze statues Perseus Arming, Icarus and Comedy and Tragedy (1891–92) formed a trilogy which referenced his own life. Perseus Arming had a huge impact on a new generation of artists, becoming a particular inspiration for the New Sculpture movement, since the method of casting (lost wax) was new to the English milieu and its height of 29 inches was innovative. It was larger than a bibelot, which might decorate a drawing room, yet smaller than a typical sculpture.

=== Creative period ===
Having returned to England, Gilbert took a studio in a complex off Fulham Road, where he built a foundry with Thomas Stirling Lee and Edward Onslow Ford. His next major work was again an innovation in terms of size; the Fawcett memorial (1885–87) featured a bronze bust of politician Henry Fawcett above seven small detailed figures of around fifteen inches, which individually represented Fawcett's virtues. The memorial received praise from critics when it was unveiled at Westminster Abbey on 29 January 1887. By then Gilbert had been commissioned to produce another memorial, this time for Golden Jubilee of Queen Victoria, which was placed in the Great Hall at Winchester Castle. From the late 1880s to the mid-1890s he was in his most creative period. He diversified into goldsmithing and damascening, making an epergne (1887–1890) given to Queen Victoria by officers of the British Army and a chain for the mayor of Preston (1888–1892). Gilbert produced medals, such as the cast bronze portrait of Matthew Ridley Corbet (1881) and the struck bronze medal marking 50 years of the Art Union of London (1887). He also created spoons, cups, dishes and jewellery; many of his designs can be seen in the collection of Stichting van Caloen on display at Loppem Castle in Belgium. Marion Spielmann, a contemporary art critic, wrote in 1901 "his taste is so pure, his genius so exquisitely right, that he may give full rein to his fancy without danger where another man would run riot and come to grief".

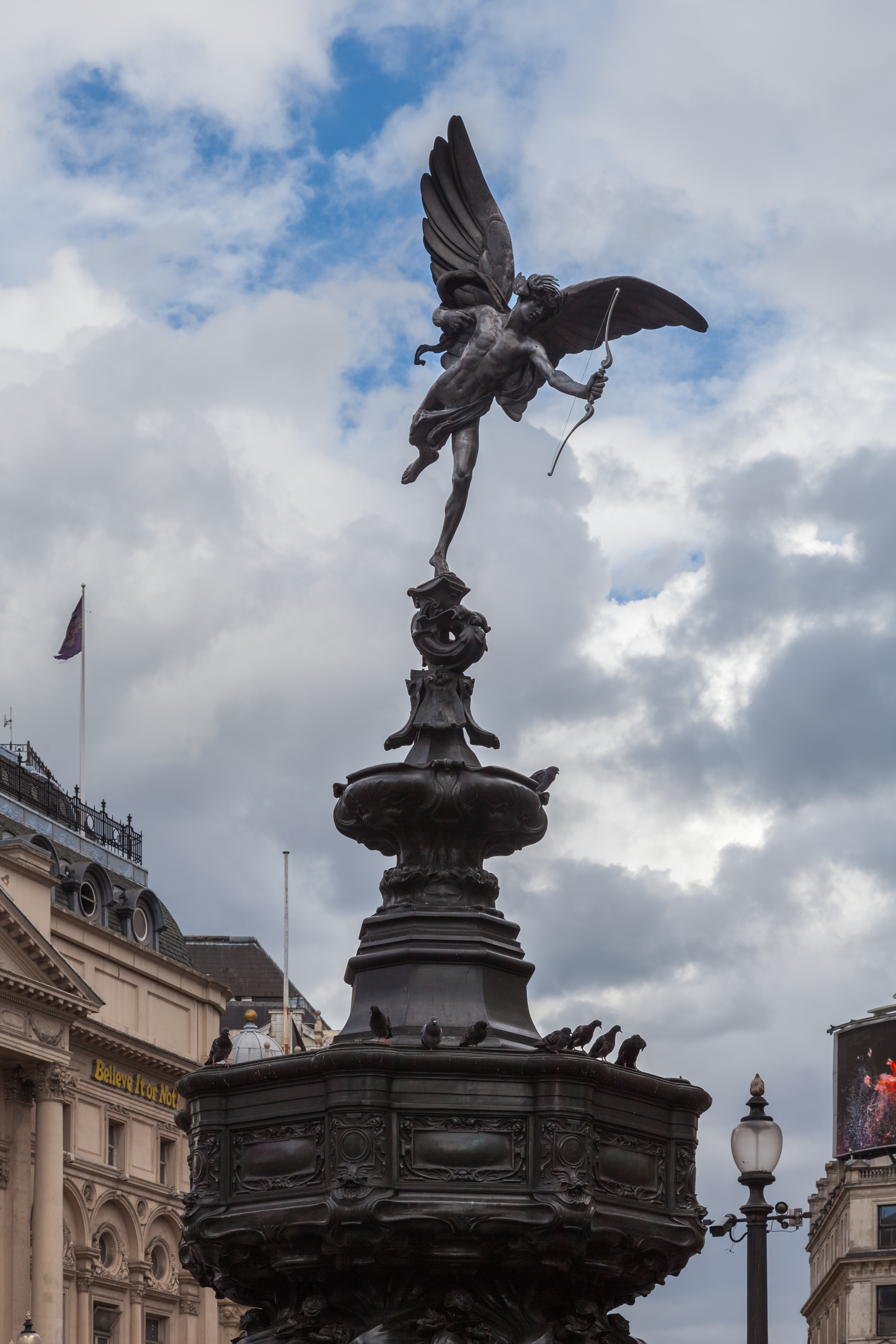
The Shaftesbury Memorial Fountain in Piccadilly Circus. Anteros is one of the first statues to be cast in aluminium.

Gilbert's next work of note was the Shaftesbury Memorial Fountain (1886–1893). The philanthropist Anthony Ashley-Cooper, 7th Earl of Shaftesbury, had died in late 1885 and it was swiftly decided to commemorate his life with two monuments, one at Westminster Abbey and another at Cambridge Circus, at the beginning of Shaftesbury Avenue (which was concurrently named after him). The memorial was commissioned in 1886 and officially opened at Piccadilly Circus in London in 1893. Gilbert had accepted the commission with assurances that he would be given used gunmetal to melt down and reuse, however the government did not supply him with it. He had already produced the casts, so he was forced to buy copper to use instead, which meant that he took a substantial financial hit; the fountain should have cost £3,000 (equivalent to about £337,132 in 2025) and in the end the figure was £7,000 (equivalent to about £786,642 in 2025), with Gilbert being forced to make up the difference. It was only because he had been experimenting with different techniques that he was able to cast aluminium, a then new material which he used to create the statue which topped the sculpture. It is commonly believed that the statue depicts Eros, but it is actually his brother Anteros, the avenger of unrequited love. The fountain is now well-regarded and seen as a national treasure, but at the time it was controversial, with opinions on its value mixed. The mainstream media criticised the design of the fountain which led to passing flower girls being drenched in water and hooliganism meant it needed to be guarded for a year. Eight drinking cups on chains had been provided for pedestrians to quench their thirst and Gilbert stated that just one day after the opening, only two cups remained. He referred to the "painful experience of witnessing the utter failure of my intention and design".

In this period, Gilbert made statues of Donald Mackay, 11th Lord Reay, and prison reformer John Howard. He produced memorials of the Duke of Clarence and of Lord Arthur Russell, and a memorial font for the son of the 4th Marquess of Bath. He produced busts of Cyril Flower, John R. Clayton (later broken up by the artist), George Frederic Watts, Henry Tate, George Birdwood, Richard Owen and George Grove. He also designed the statue of David Davies of Llandinam which stands in front of the Barry Docks offices.

Gilbert was made a member of the Royal Academy of Arts in 1892. He received many other honours, such as Royal Victorian Order of the fourth class (1897). He became a member of the International Society of Sculptors, Painters and Gravers and in 1889 he won the Grand Prix at the Exposition Universelle in Paris. By the time of Boehm's death in 1890, Gilbert had become England's best known living sculptor. He was a member of the Athenaeum and Garrick clubs in London and was a well-known figure with his cape, sombrero and walking-stick. His friends included the artists Watts, Edward Burne-Jones, Frederic Leighton and James Abbott McNeill Whistler. Befriending Princess Louise had brought him into high society and he built a large house for his family with an attached studio in 16 Maida Vale, in north London. Gilbert's generous and extravagant lifestyle was leading him into debt and as his fame grew, his private life began to fall apart. His wife Alice was not at ease in London society and preferred to stay in a rented house in Gomshall, Surrey; soon after the unveiling of the Shaftesbury Memorial Fountain, she had a breakdown and was committed to an asylum. Without Boehm to advise him, Gilbert found it difficult to track his commissions. He almost never drew up contracts with clients and it was easy for disagreements to arise.

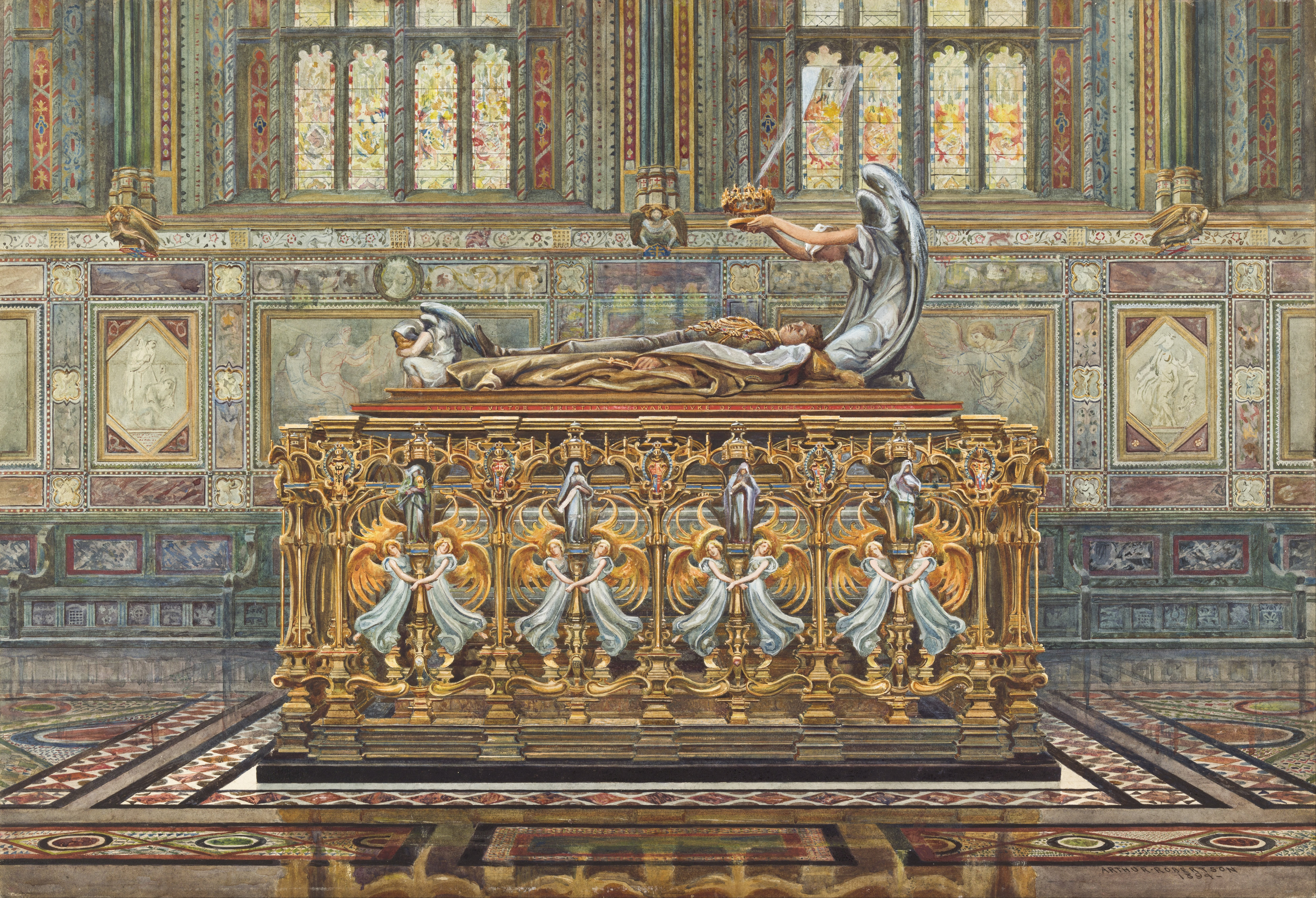
Drawing by Arthur Robertson of Alfred Gilbert's plans for the tomb of Prince Albert Victor

In 1892, Gilbert was asked by the Prince (later Edward VII) and Princess of Wales (Alexandra of Denmark) to build the tomb for their recently deceased eldest son Prince Albert Victor in St George's Chapel, Windsor. Prince Albert Victor had been heir to the throne and died of pneumonia resulting from contracting influenza during the 1889–1890 flu pandemic. The tomb has been described by a critic as "the finest single example of late 19th-century sculpture in the British Isles". A recumbent effigy of the prince wearing a Hussar uniform lies above the tomb. Kneeling over him is an angel, holding a heavenly crown. The tomb is surrounded by an elaborate railing, with figures of saints. The perfectionist Gilbert spent too much time and money on the commission. Five of the saint figures were only completed with "a greater roughness and pittedness of texture" after his return to Britain in the 1920s.

Another 1892 commission which Gilbert struggled with was the Memorial Tablet to Edward Robert Bulwer-Lytton, First Earl of Lytton (1892–1902). Lady Lytton wished to remember her husband the politician Edward Bulwer-Lytton with a plaque in the crypt of St Paul's Cathedral. Having taken on the work, Gilbert never supplied the plaque, despite her frequent visits to his studio. Instead, she was forced to buy the bronze cast at a bankruptcy sale and to ask Edwin Lutyens (her son-in-law) to make a surrounding mould before it was eventually installed at St Paul's in 1903.

=== Disgrace ===
By 1898, Gilbert was in debt and the number of complaints from clients asking for completed works was increasing. Instead of finishing the tomb for Prince Albert Victor, which only had seven of the twelve saints around it, Gilbert took another royal commission, namely building the mortuary chapel for Prince Henry of Battenberg. Ultimately, Gilbert was forced to file for bankruptcy in 1901. He sent his family before him to Bruges in Belgium and stayed behind to pack up his studio, destroying many casts in the process.

Edward VII offered Gilbert a studio at Windsor Castle where he could complete the tomb project but Gilbert only compounded his problems by asking the royal family for permission to publish photographs of the work in progress in The Art Journal and then proceeding to do so even though he was explicitly asked not to. To make matters worse, the photographs depicted the ivory and bronze statues which had been originally attached to the tomb and subsequently sold off by Gilbert in 1899. They had been replaced by the bronze casts which still sit on the tomb, but the king had paid for the originals and was angered, breaking off all communication with Gilbert.

By the mid-1900s, Gilbert was in serious problems. In 1904, he had separated from his wife. Dissatisfied clients had spoken to a gossip magazine called Truth, which released two well-circulated critical articles in 1906. The Duke of Rutland was driven to complain to the president of the Royal Academy (Edward Poynter) about an uncompleted order in 1908 and Gilbert was given the choice either to resign or to be expelled from the Academy. Poynter commented "We have all come to the regretful conclusion that he is hopelessly incorrigible". Gilbert decided to quit, resigning his professorship and also his Royal Victorian Order. Things deteriorated further when he had an affair with a client, Eliza Macloghlin, and she demanded to have the funeral urn she had commissioned, Mr and Mrs Percy Plantagenet Macloghlin (1905–1909), also known as Mors Janua Vitae. Upon not receiving it, she threw stones at the windows of his studio in Bruges and wrote a demented letter to King Edward VII. Her handwriting was similar to Gilbert's and it was believed he had written the screed, making his situation even more dire. When his son Francis went to see Gilbert in 1908, he found him hungry and lacking adequate clothes. In this period, Gilbert completed few works. He was able to finish A Dream of Joy during a Sleep of Sorrow (1908–1913), a bronze chimney piece commissioned by the Wilson family for their home in Leeds, yet instead of supplying an inset portrait of Mrs Wilson as requested, he included a watercolour painting of his second wife, Stéphanie Quaghebeur.

=== Rehabilitation ===
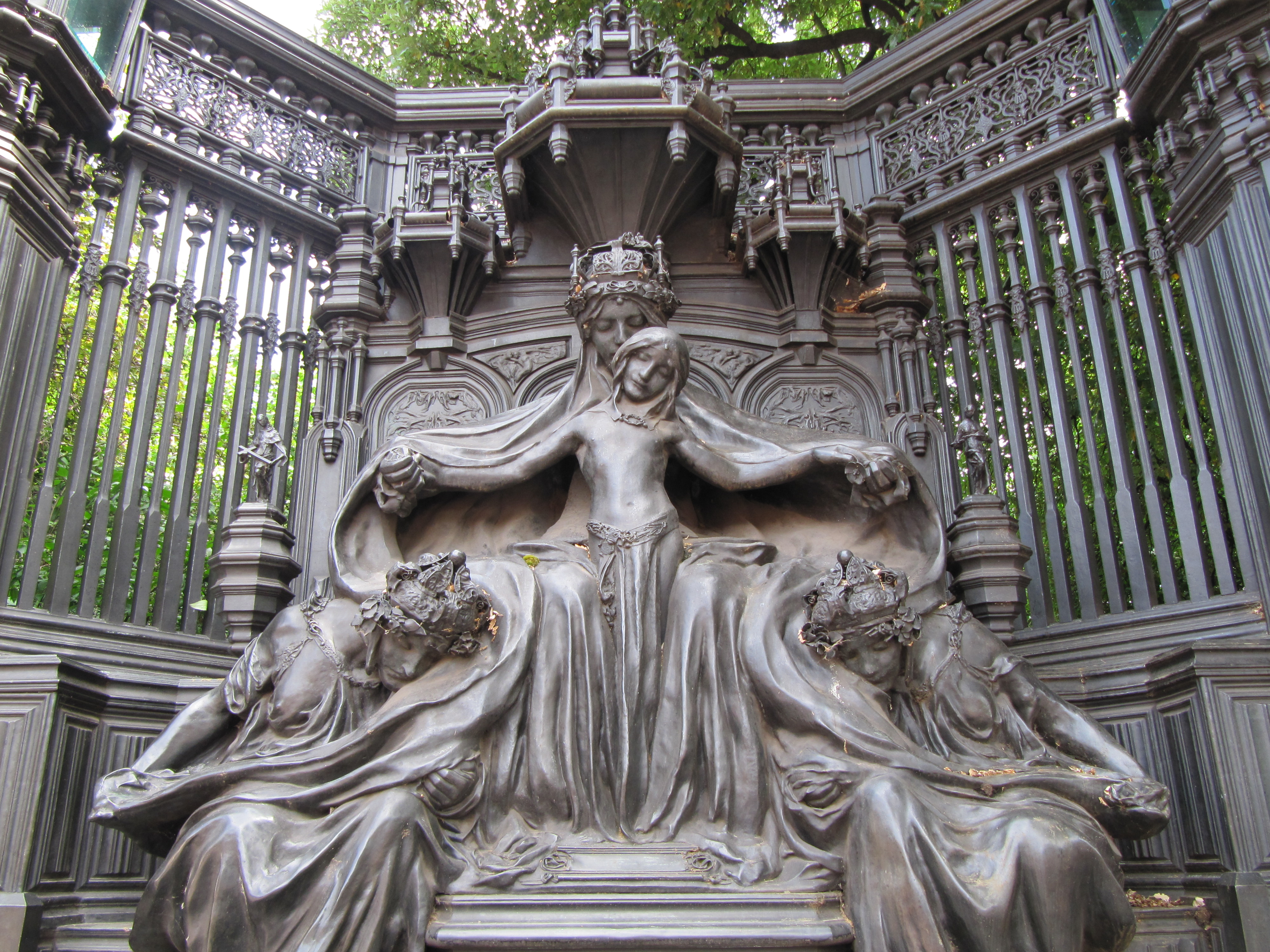
Queen Alexandra Memorial (detail). The maiden is supported by figures representing Faith, Hope and Charity.

During World War I, Gilbert remained in Bruges. The three illustrations for Arthur Conan Doyle's short story "His Last Bow. The War Service of Sherlock Holmes" published in The Strand Magazine in 1917 and in 1921 three more for "The Adventure of the Mazarin Stone" were not, as has been previously believed, by Alfred Gilbert. They were the work of his contemporary, the oil painter, Albert Thomas Gilbert. Alfred married his housekeeper Stéphanie Quaghebeur on 1 March 1918 and they moved to Rome together in 1924. In the early 1920s, Gilbert had been largely forgotten in England and was assumed to have died, since he had fled to Europe decades before. However, he was still receiving a civil list pension and when the journalist Isabel McAllister took an interest in him, she was able to easily find him.

McAllister was a fan, commenting in 1932 "One must be entirely loyal to him, and never admit faults to those who ... are always ready to look out for them". She decided to write his biography and campaigned for his re-acceptance in English high society. Writing to King George V and various dignitaries, she promoted Gilbert's talents, arguing it was time for him to finish the tomb of Prince Albert Victor and also that he was the perfect person to take the commission to create a memorial to Queen Alexandra, who had died in 1925. The King was glad to hear news of his old acquaintance and Lady Helena Gleichen became Gilbert's promoter, offering use of her studio at St James Palace if the funds could be raised to bring him from Italy.

Gilbert returned to England on 26 July 1926 and his mental state concerned Helena Gleichen; she said he was "broken with nerves, and agitation". Friends rallied around him and Gilbert settled down. The King provided a stipend and Gilbert was permitted to use studios at St James's Palace and later Kensington Palace. By March 1928 he had finally finished the five statues which completed the tomb of Prince Albert Victor (George's older brother). In late 1926 Gilbert had won the commission to make the Queen Alexandra Memorial. This captured his imagination since he saw the major public artwork as his swan song. Furthermore, Alexandra had been a firm friend of his, supporting him financially even when he failed to complete the tomb of her eldest son. After he had fled England for the second time, she commissioned a portrait from him in 1903 (it is unknown if it was ever completed). In 1904 she sent him £100 (equivalent to about £10,513 in 2025).

The sculpted fountain of the memorial blended Art Nouveau and gothic styles, and was built into the wall of Marlborough House. It was officially unveiled on 8 June 1932, which was announced as Alexandra Rose Day. It depicts three figures representing Faith, Hope, and Charity who are helping a maiden move across the stream of life. Gilbert was knighted the day afterwards and was also readmitted into the Royal Academy. His return to favour was complete.

== Personal life ==
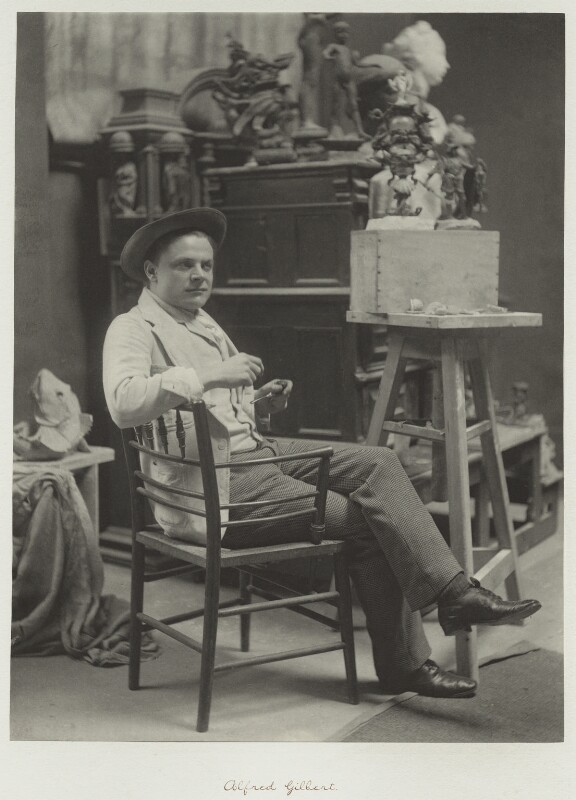
Gilbert photographed in his Fulham Road studio, circa 1889

On 3 January 1876, Gilbert eloped to Paris with his first cousin, Alice Jane Gilbert (1847–1916), and they were married the same day. They had five children: George (born 9 May 1876), Mary (born 1877), Francis (born 1879), Alfredo (born 1880) and Charlotte Emily (born 1881). Charlotte was to become a notable suffragette under the name Caprina Fahey.

Gilbert's wife Alice had a breakdown soon after the official opening of the Shaftesbury Memorial Fountain in 1893 and spent time in a mental asylum. The family left England again in 1901 and settled in Bruges. The marriage broke down in 1904 and Alice was hospitalised again. She died in 1916. Gilbert remarried in 1918 with his housekeeper Stéphanie Quaghebeur, by which time he had already taken on responsibility for helping to raise her seven children from a previous marriage. They had stopped living together by 1926, with Quaghebeur remaining in Belgium when Gilbert moved back to England again, although he sent her monthly cheques to support the family until his death. At the end of his life, Gilbert was romantically linked with Georgina Becket Terrell.

== Death and legacy ==
Gilbert died on 4 November 1934 at Cromwell Nursing Home in London. He had long been sick and refusing to eat. He was then cremated. At the time of his death, Gilbert was one of the most well-known figures in English society and there were plans to make a film about him. He was then disregarded for decades, until critic Richard Dorment published a biography of Gilbert in 1985, which was followed by a retrospective at the Royal Academy of Arts in 1986. Gilbert is now regarded as one of the foremost sculptors of the Victorian age.

In 2017, a bust of Queen Victoria by Gilbert worth £1.2 million was subject to an export ban, having been sold at Sotheby's to a museum based in New York. Eventually, the Fitzwilliam Museum in Cambridge raised the funds to pay £1.01 million to keep the bust in the UK. The work of art was deemed to meet all three of the Waverley Criteria, namely that it was of national artistic importance, it was of outstanding aesthetic value and it was vital for the study of sculpture. The sum was raised through donations and a £267,600 grant from the National Heritage Memorial Fund (NHMF).

== Gallery ==
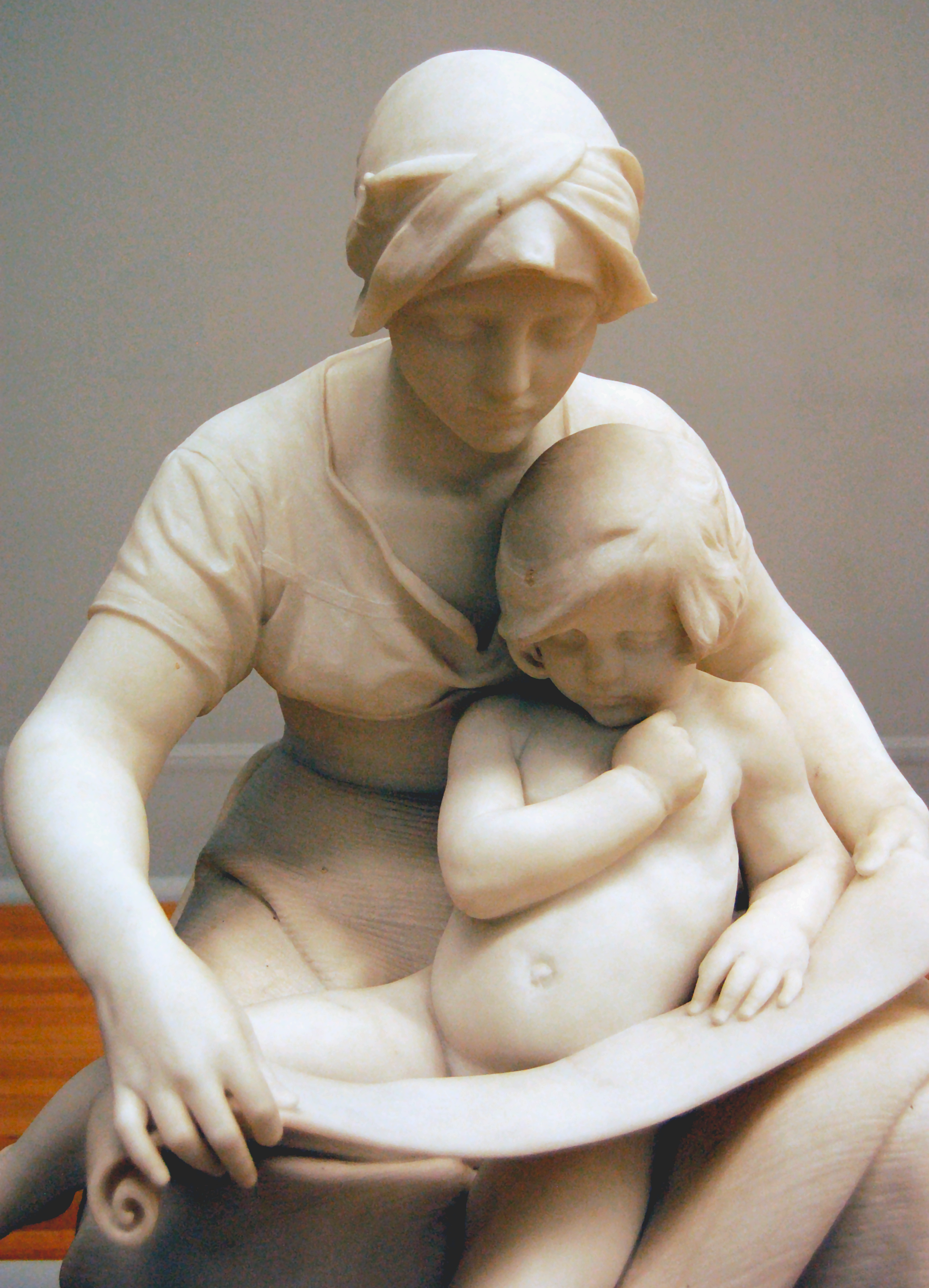
Mother Teaching Child (1881)

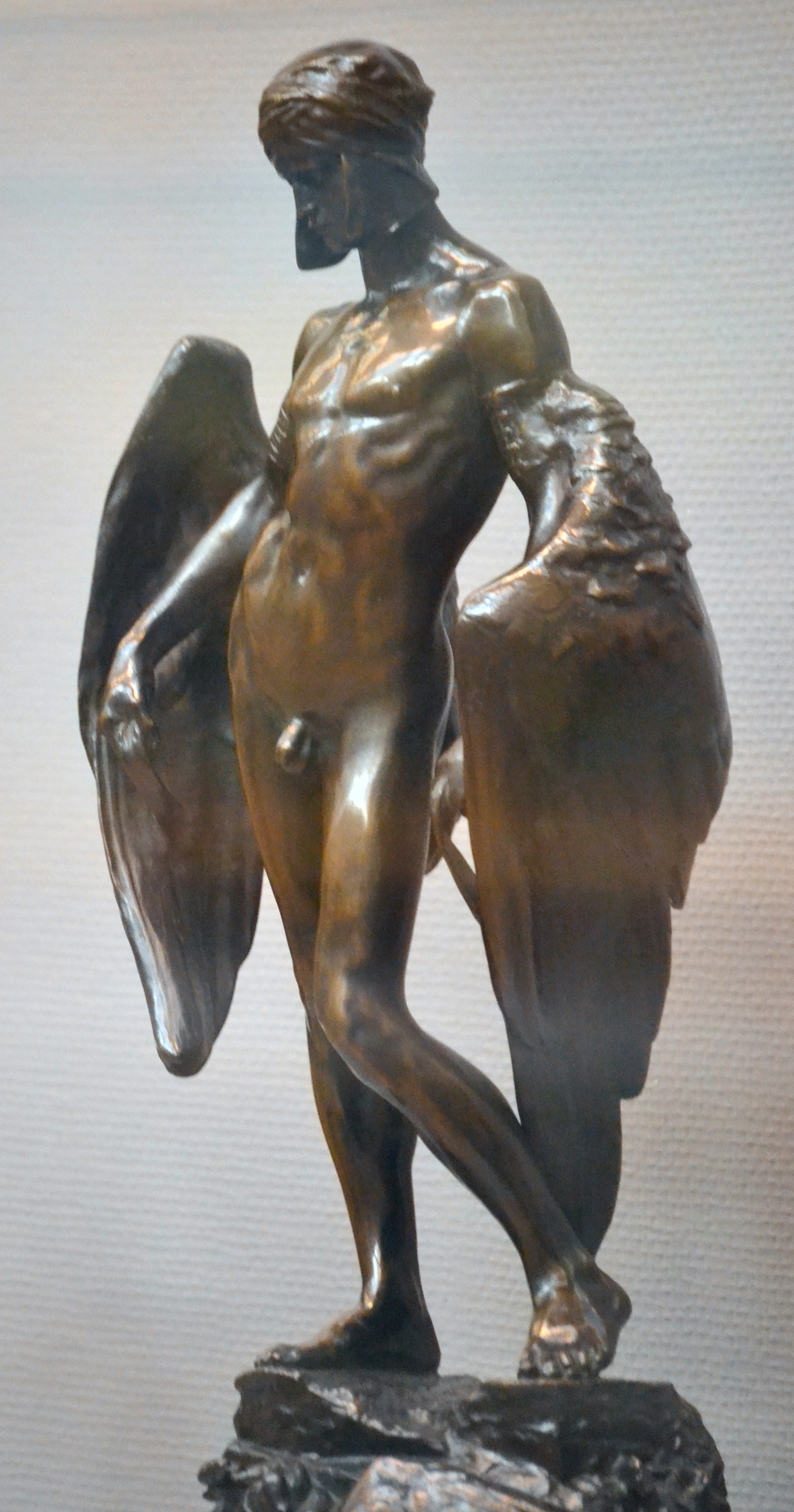
Icarus (1882–84)

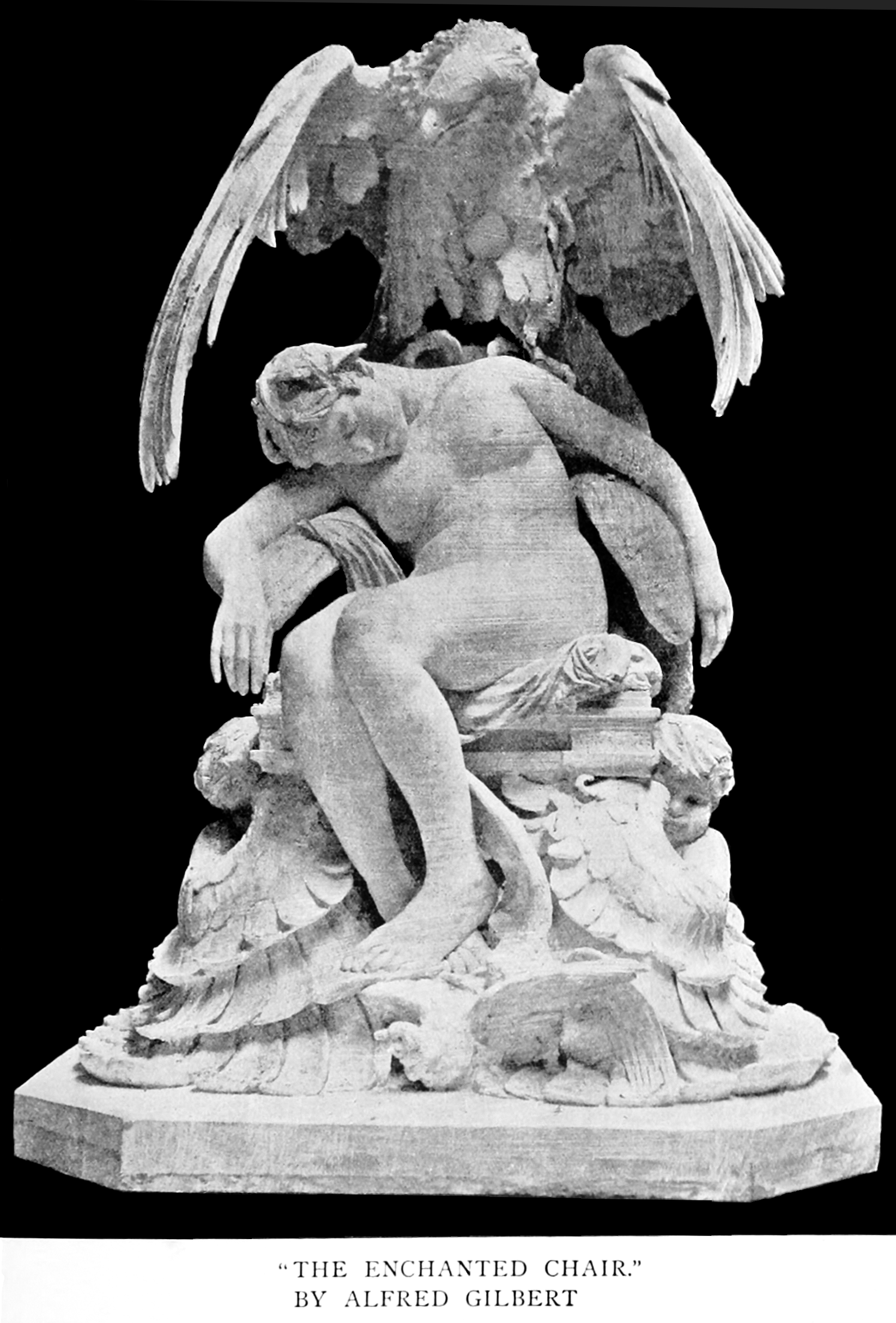
The Enchanted Chair (c. 1885)

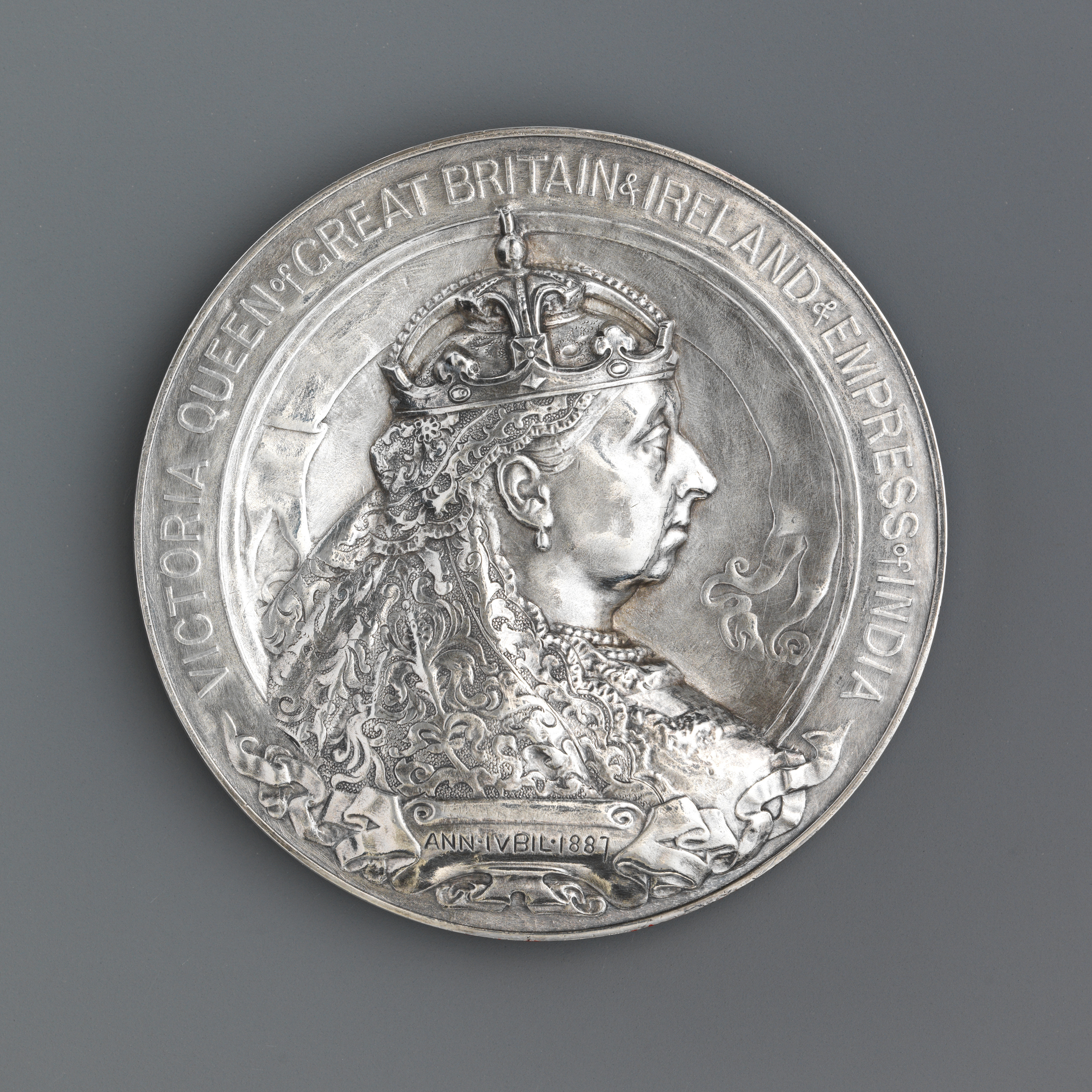
Silver commemorative coin (1887)

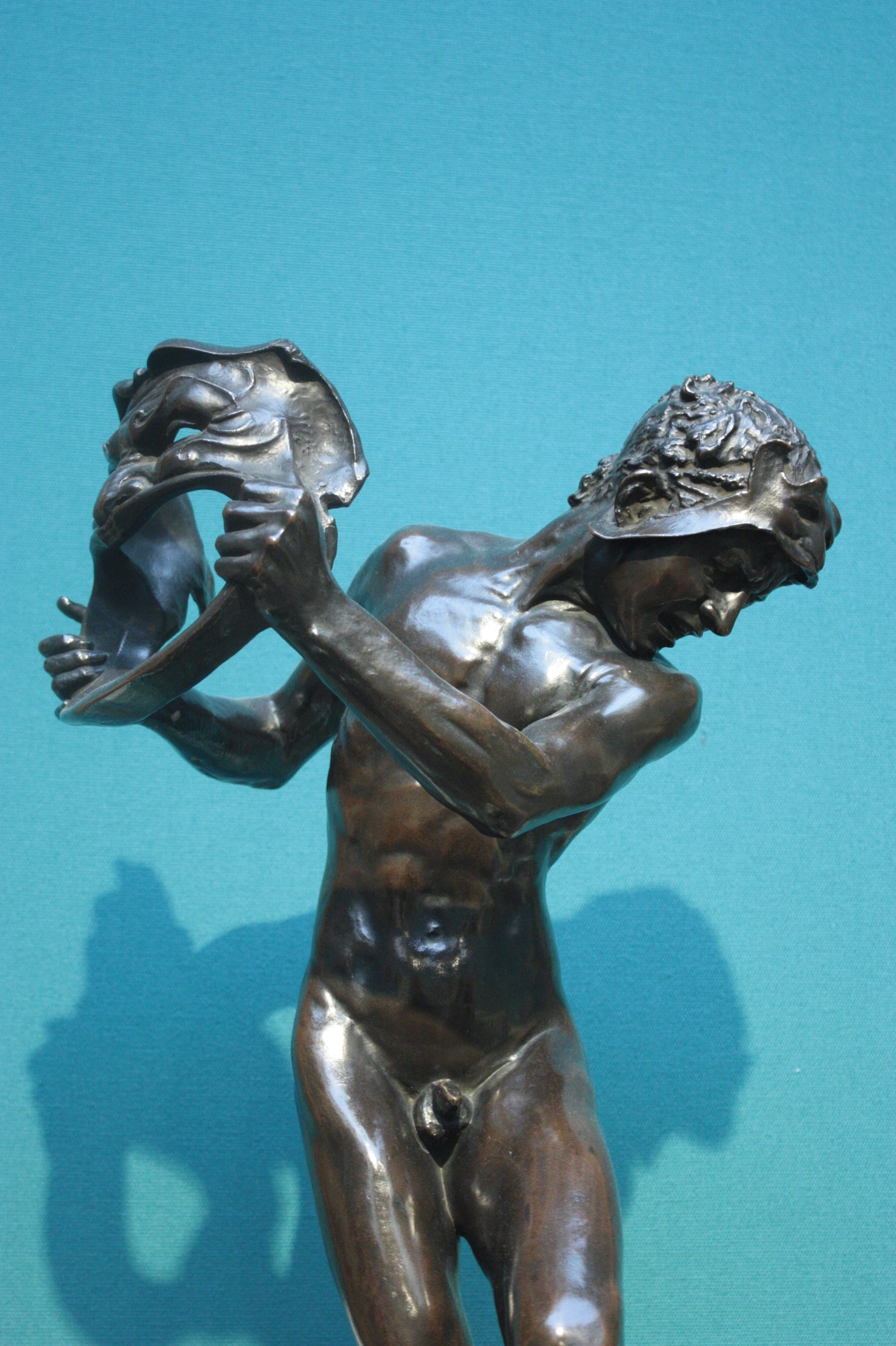
Comedy and Tragedy (1891)

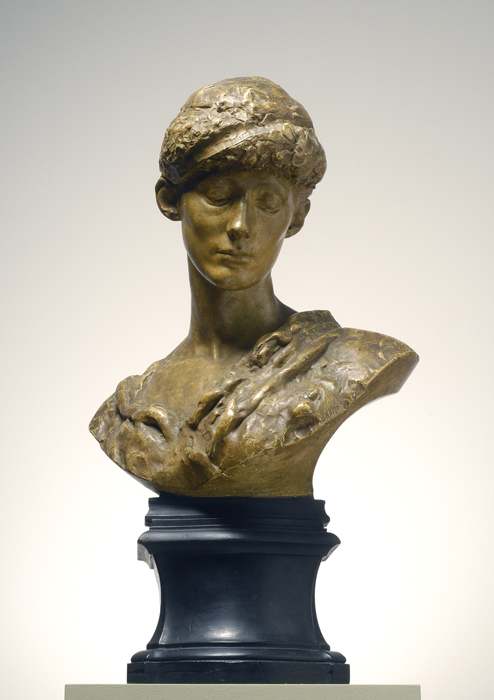
Bust of Nina Cust (1894)

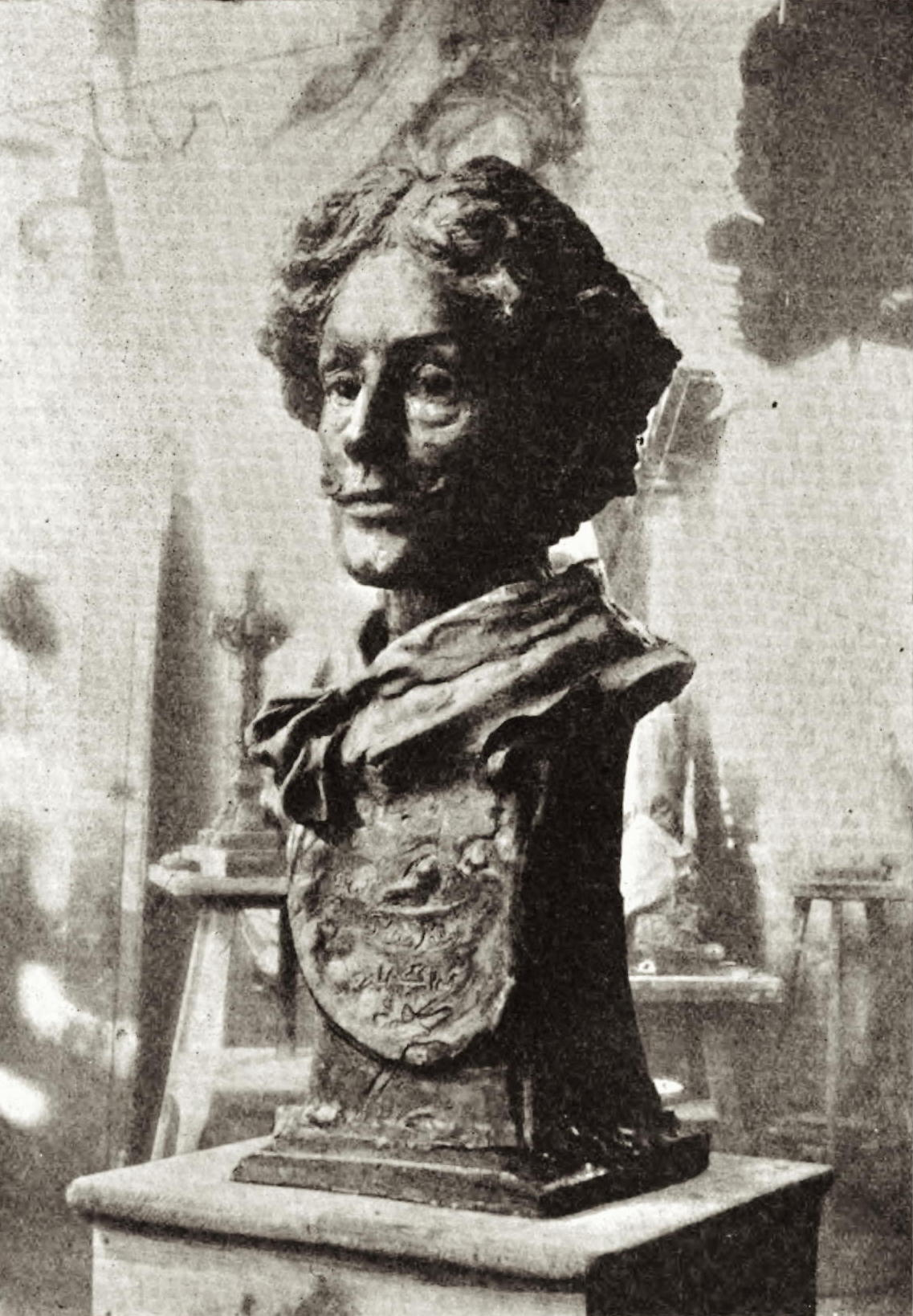
Bust of Francis Petrus Paulus (1906)

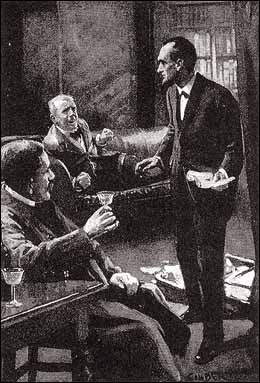
Illustration for Arthur Conan Doyle's "His Last Bow. The War Service of Sherlock Holmes" (1917)

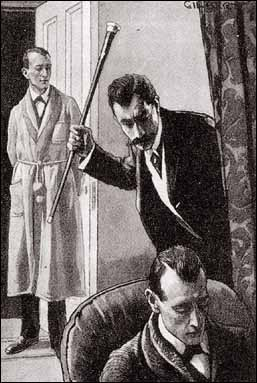
Illustration for Arthur Conan Doyle's "The Adventure of the Mazarin Stone" (1921)
