= Alexandra Rose Day =

Charitable fundraising event in the United Kingdom

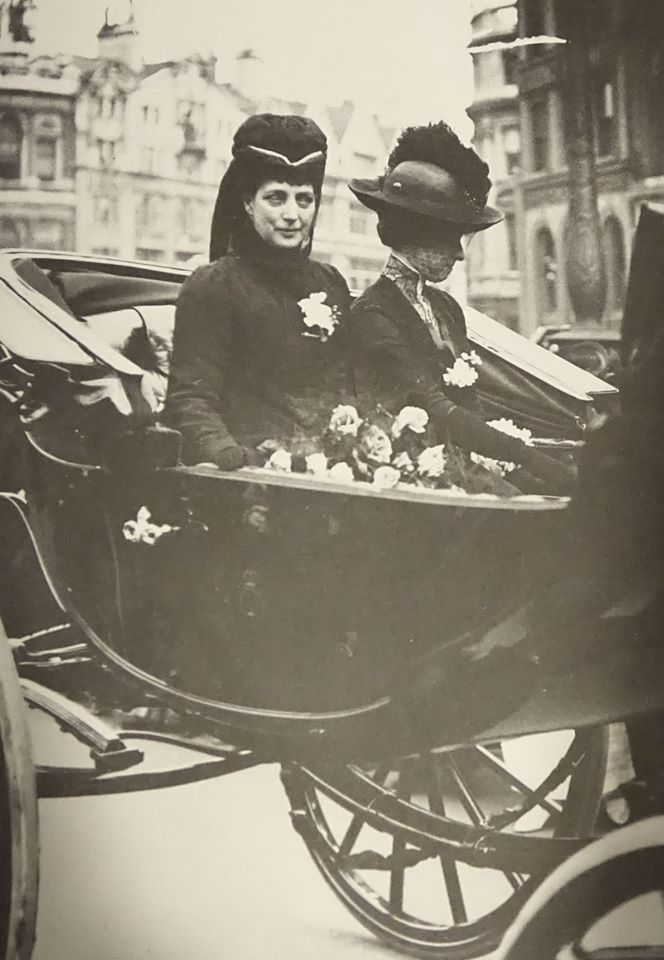
- Queen Alexandra and Princess Victoria driving to the Mansion House on the first Alexandra Rose Day in 1912
- Observed by: United Kingdom
- Significance: Anniversary of the arrival of Queen Alexandra from Denmark to the United Kingdom
- Observances: Sale of artificial silk roses to raise money for hospitals
- Date: A variable date in June; Original date: 26 June 1912
- Frequency: annual

The Alexandra Rose Day (or simply Alexandra Day) is a charitable fund raising event held in June in the United Kingdom since 1912 by Alexandra Rose Charities. It was first launched on the 50th anniversary of the arrival of Queen Alexandra from her native Denmark to the United Kingdom. She requested that the anniversary be marked by the sale of roses in London to raise funds for her favourite charities.

== History ==
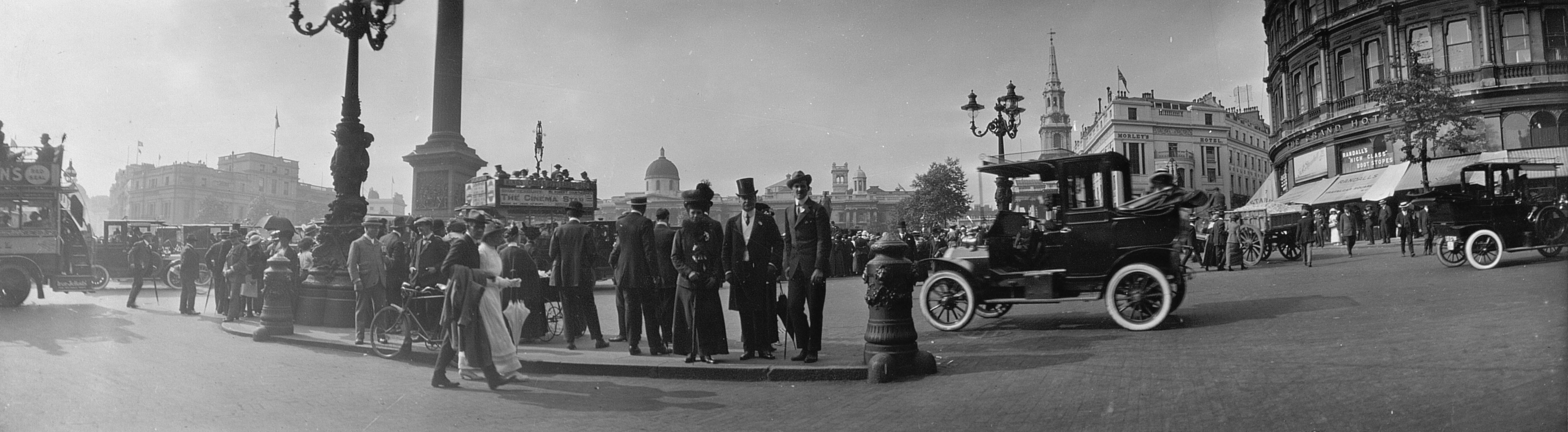
Maria Feodorovna, Empress Dowager of Russia and sister of the Queen Alexandra herself, at Trafalgar Square on the occasion of the Alexandra Rose Day in 1914.

The arrival of Princess Alexandra of Denmark in the United Kingdom for her marriage to the Prince of Wales (later King Edward VII) in 1863 was a public occasion. This was attributable to the then recent increase in the railway network, the lack of royal occasions in preceding years and the new process of photography, which had made it possible for pictures of the Princess to be sold in shops prior to her arrival. The City of London spent £40,000 on decorations and illuminations, and the result was a tumultuous reception for the bride.

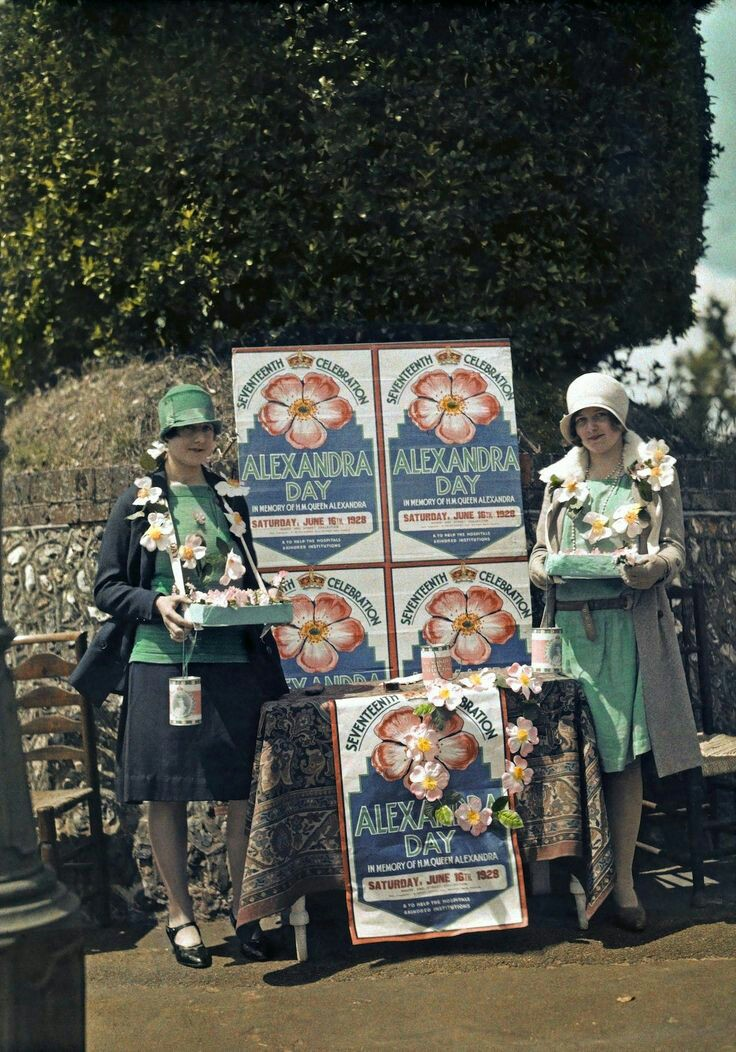
Selling Queen Alexandra roses for charity in Seaford, East Sussex, England, in 1928

When the 50th anniversary of her arrival and wedding came, a processional drive through the streets of London seemed an obvious choice, but Alexandra wanted an occasion that would help the sick and needy. She developed an idea which would benefit the funds of London hospitals through the sale of artificial wild roses, which were to be made by young women and girls with disabilities at the John Groom Industrial Training Home.

The day was to be called "Alexandra Rose Day". The first event raised £32,000, equivalent to £3,160,188 in 2025. The funds raised were a great benefit to hospitals, and the day became an annual occasion. By 1920, £775,000 had been raised for London hospitals.

Queen Alexandra's Rose Day continued to be celebrated even after her death in 1925. Autochrome colour photos exist of women selling paper roses with poster billboards and decorated collecting cans in Seaford, East Sussex on the 'Seventeenth Celebration Alexandra Day in memory of H.M Queen Alexandra Saturday June 16, 1928.'

After a period of raising money for charities which do not normally get national attention for fundraising, today the charity is addressing food poverty in London, most notably through providing vouchers for disadvantaged families to buy fresh fruit and vegetables.

The Prime Minister traditionally launches the day by being the first person to buy a rose.

Princess Alexandra, The Honourable Lady Ogilvy, Queen Alexandra's great-granddaughter, is the current president of Alexandra Rose Day.
