= Beta (disambiguation) =

Beta (B, β) is the second letter of the Greek alphabet.

Beta or BETA may also refer to:

== Arts, entertainment, and media ==
=== Films ===
- Beta (film), a 1992 Bollywood film directed by Indra Kumar
- Beta Test (film), a 2016 American science fiction film directed by Nicholas Gyeney
- The Beta Test, a 2021 American dark comedy directed by Jim Cummings

=== Fictional entities ===
- BETA (Muv-Luv) (Beings of the Extra Terrestrial origin which is Adversary of human race), an alien race from the video game series Muv-Luv
- β, a classification of strength in the EarthBound, or Mother, series of Nintendo role-playing games
- Beta, a wolf character in the animated film Storks
- BETA, an organization in the 1986 TV series The Adventures of the Galaxy Rangers
- Beta (The Walking Dead), an antagonist in the Walking Dead comic series
- Beta Hirogen, the second in command of a Hirogen hunting party, as seen in Star Trek: Voyager
- Beta Quadrant, one of four quadrants in the galaxy in Star Trek
- Beta (ベータ), an elf character and the second member of Shadow Garden in the light novel and anime series The Eminence in Shadow
- Beta, a humanised Dalek from The Evil of the Daleks
- Beta, a dog character in the film Up

=== Other uses in arts, entertainment, and media ===
- Beta (Magic: The Gathering), the second (revised) part of the first set of the card game Magic: The Gathering
- Beta chord
- Beta News Agency, Serbian independent news agency
- Beta Recordings, a record label headed by John B
- Lifetime (TV network), pre-launch branded as BETA
- beta, a combat robot competing in BattleBots
- Beta, a mountain biking magazine and website launched by Outside (company) in 2021
- Minecraft Beta, a development stage of Minecraft

== Mathematics, finance, and statistics ==
- Beta (finance), the β coefficient in the capital asset pricing model
- β, the probability of a Type II error in statistics; see Type I and type II errors
- β-reduction, a reduction rule for lambda calculus
- Beta distribution, in statistics, a family of continuous probability distributions
- Beta function, a special function also known as the Euler integral of the first kind
- Beta invariant, of a matroid
- Dirichlet beta function
- Eratosthenes, Greek mathematician nicknamed Beta (Βῆτα)
- Standardized coefficient or beta coefficient, in statistics, the estimate of an analysis performed on variables that have been standardized so that they have variances of 1

== Organisations ==
- Beta (motorcycle manufacturer), an Italian off-road motorcycles manufacturer
- BETA Cargo, a defunct Brazilian airline
- Beta Technologies, a US electric aircraft manufacturer
- BETA UAS, drone manufacturer based in Bandung, Indonesia
- British Equestrian Trade Association, a membership organisation in the UK
- Broadcasting and Entertainment Trades Alliance, sometimes known by the acronym "BETA"
- National Beta Club, a high school honor society
- South Texas Business Education & Technology Academy (BETA)

== Places ==
- Beta, Ohio, a ghost town in the US
- Beța, a village in Lopadea Nouă Commune, Alba County, Romania
- Beta, a village in Mugeni Commune, Harghita County, Romania
- Beta Israel, a name given to Jewish communities that occupied territories of the Aksumite and Ethiopian (Habesh or Abyssinia) empires
- Beta (Olt), a tributary of the Olt in Harghita County, Romania
- Beta, a tributary of the Târnava Mare in Harghita County, Romania

== Psychology ==
- Beta movement, a perceptual illusion whereby two or more still images are combined by the brain into surmised motion
- Beta quadra, one of the four quadras in socionics
- Type-beta, a personality type now commonly referred to as type-B; see Type A and Type B personality theory

== Science ==
=== Biology and medicine ===
- Beta (plant), a genus of flowering plants, mostly referred to as beets
- Beta (grape), a variety of North American grape
- β_{1} and β_{2}, or beta-1 and beta-2, adrenergic receptors
- Beta, a rank in a community of social animals; see Alpha
- Beta carbon, in organic chemistry, the second carbon atom in a chain when counting from a functional group; see Alpha and beta carbon
- Beta cell, a type of cell in the pancreas, which produces insulin
- Beta sheet, a secondary protein structure
- Beta-endorphin, a kind of neurotransmitter
- SARS-CoV-2 Beta variant, one of the variants of SARS-CoV-2, the virus that causes COVID-19

=== Physics ===
- Beta (plasma physics), the ratio of thermal to magnetic pressure in plasma
- Beta (velocity), the speed of an object relative to the speed of light in special relativity
- Compressibility, a measure of the relative volume change of a fluid or solid as a response to a pressure change (symbol "β")
- Beta function (physics), also β(g)—a function in quantum field theory
- Beta particle, a name used to refer to high-energy electrons (β^{−}) or positrons (β^{+}) emitted by certain types of radioactive nuclei
- Phase Constant (β), in electromagnetics and electrical engineering, used in the theory of plane waves; see Propagation constant
- Precursor yield fraction, leading to delayed neutrons in nuclear reactors
- Thermodynamic beta, in thermodynamics and statistical mechanics, a numerical quantity related to the thermodynamic temperature of a system

=== Other uses in science ===
- Hurricane Beta, a 2005 hurricane
- Tropical Storm Beta (2020), a tropical storm

== Sports ==
- Beta (climbing), jargon that designates information about a climb
- Beta Ethniki, the second tier division of the Greek football (soccer) league

== Technology ==
- Beta (time signal), a service broadcast in the very low frequency range in Russia
- Beta, the common-emitter current gain of a bipolar junction transistor
- Betacam, a family of half-inch professional videotape products developed by Sony
- Betamax, home videocassette tape recording format developed by Sony
- BETA (programming language)
- Beta release, or betaware, a phase in software development before an official release
- Beta mode, flat or reverse-pitch propeller settings used for ground operations in airplanes with turboprop engines
- Perpetual beta, software or a system that never leaves the beta development stage

== Transport ==
- Lancia Beta, a car produced by Lancia
- Beta (1864 barque), a Norwegian barque in service 1880-93

== Other uses ==
- Generation Beta, the demographic cohort succeeding Generation Alpha
- Beta male (slang), a pejorative term for a man considered as weak and emasculated
- Beta reader, a person who critiques a written work prior to public release
- Beta Vukanović (1872–1972), Serbian painter and centenarian
- Voiced bilabial fricative (β), the voiced bilabial fricative symbol of the International Phonetic Alphabet

== See also ==
- ß, a German letter that resembles β
- B3ta, a British humour webcommunity
- Betta, a genus of fish, often misspelled "beta"
- Coral the Betta, a character in the Sonic the Hedgehog comics by Archie
- Beti (disambiguation)
