= Beta =

Second letter of the Greek alphabet

Beta (UK: /ˈbiːtə/, US: /ˈbeɪtə/; uppercase Β, lowercase β, or cursive ϐ; Ancient Greek: βῆτα, romanized: bē̂ta or Greek: βήτα, romanized: víta) is the second letter of the Greek alphabet. In the system of Greek numerals, it has a value of 2. In Ancient Greek, beta represented the voiced bilabial plosive IPA: [b]. In Modern Greek, it represents the voiced labiodental fricative IPA: [v], while IPA: [b] in borrowed words is instead commonly transcribed as μπ. Letters that arose from beta include the Roman letter ⟨B⟩ and the Cyrillic letters ⟨Б⟩ and ⟨В⟩.

== Name ==
Like the names of most other Greek letters, the name of beta comes from the acrophonic name of the corresponding letter in Phoenician, which was the common Semitic word *bayt ('house'; compare Arabic: بيت bayt and Hebrew: בית báyit). In ancient Greek, its name was βῆτα bêta, pronounced [bɛ̂ːta]. In modern Greek, it is spelled βήτα víta in monotonic orthography, and pronounced [ˈvita].

== History ==
The letter beta was derived from the Phoenician letter beth.

The letter Β had the largest number of highly divergent local forms. Besides the standard form (either rounded or pointed,), there were forms as varied as (Gortyn), and (Thera), (Argos), (Melos), (Corinth), (Megara, Byzantium), and (Cyclades).

== Typography ==
In some high-quality typesetting, especially in the French tradition, a typographic variant of the lowercase letter without a descender is used within a word for ancient Greek: βίβλος is printed βίϐλος.

In typesetting technical literature, it is a commonly made mistake to use the German letter ß (a s–z or s–s ligature) as a replacement for β. The two letters resemble each other in some fonts, but they are unrelated.

== Uses ==
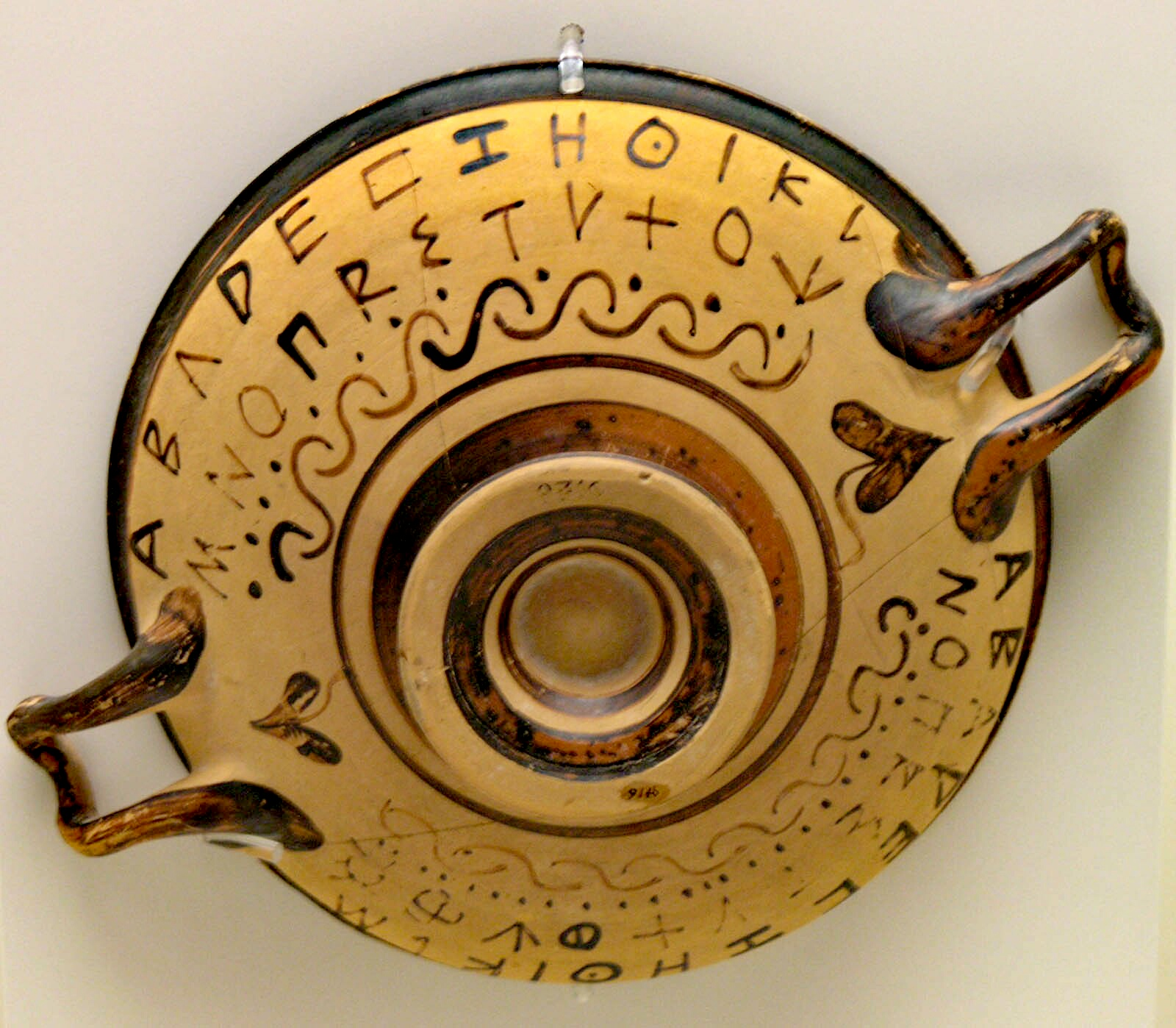
The Greek alphabet on an ancient black figure vessel, with the characteristically angular beta of the time

=== Algebraic numerals ===
In the system of Greek numerals, beta has a value of 2. Such use is denoted by a number mark: Β′.

=== Finance ===
Beta is used in finance as a measure of investment portfolio risk.

=== International Phonetic Alphabet ===
In the International Phonetic Alphabet, Greek minuscule beta denotes a voiced bilabial fricative [β].

A superscript version may also indicate a compressed vowel, like [ɯᵝ].

=== Meteorology ===
Beta has twice been used to name an Atlantic Basin tropical cyclone:

- Hurricane Beta, in 2005
- Tropical Storm Beta, in 2020

=== Mathematics and science ===
- Beta is often used to denote a variable in mathematics and physics, where it often has specific meanings for certain applications.
- Some uses of beta in math include:
  - β is sometimes used as a placeholder for an ordinal number if α is already used. For example, the two roots of a quadratic equation are typically labelled α and β.
  - In regression analysis, ⟨B⟩ symbolizes nonstandardized partial slope coefficients, whereas ⟨β⟩ represents standardized (standard deviation-score form) coefficients; in both cases, the coefficients reflect the change in the criterion Y per one-unit change in the value of the associated predictor X.
  - In statistics, beta may represent type II error, or regression slope.
  - Dirichlet beta function
- Some uses of beta in physics and engineering include:
  - In spaceflight, beta angle describes the angle between the orbit plane of a spacecraft or other body and the vector from the sun.
  - In nuclear physics, β is used for a beta particle (an unbound energetic electron or positron).
  - In statistical thermodynamics, a quantity known as thermodynamic beta expresses how the entropy of system responds to a small increase in temperature.
- β is also used for naming in biology. For example, e.g. β-Carotene, a primary source of provitamin A; Β Cells in pancreatic islets, which produce insulin; and beta sheet, a common motif in protein secondary structure.
- The uppercase letter beta is not generally used as a symbol because it tends to be rendered identically to the uppercase Latin B.

=== Rock climbing terminology ===
The term "beta" refers to advice on how to successfully complete a particular climbing route, boulder problem, or crux sequence.

=== Slang ===
Beta male, or simply beta, is a slang term for men derived from the designation for beta animals in ethology, along with its counterpart, alpha male. The term has been used as a pejorative self-identifier among members of manosphere communities, particularly incels, who do not believe they are assertive or traditionally masculine, and feel overlooked by women. It is also used to negatively describe other men who are not assertive, particularly in heterosexual relationships.

=== Videotape formats ===
"Beta" can be used to refer to several consumer and professional videotape formats developed by Japan's Sony Corporation. Although similarly named, they are very different in function and obsolescence.

- Betamax was the name of a domestic videotape format developed in the 1970s and 1980s. It competed with the Video Home System (VHS) format developed by the Japanese Victor Company, to which it eventually succumbed. The Betamax format was also marketed Betacord by (Sanyo); some cassettes were simply labeled "Beta", and the logo was a lower-case beta. Betamax lost in the market and is an oft-used example of a technically superior solution that failed due to market forces.
- Betacam, including Beta SP and DigiBeta, is a family of professional videotape formats launched in 1982 that was the de facto standard for professional video, advertising, and television production through the 2000s. The formats outlasted analog NTSC television, and their scarcity today is because the industry has moved to HD formats.

== Unicode ==
- U+0392 Β GREEK CAPITAL LETTER BETA (&Beta;)
- U+03B2 β GREEK SMALL LETTER BETA (&beta;) (\beta in TeX)
- U+03D0 ϐ GREEK BETA SYMBOL
- U+1D5D ᵝ MODIFIER LETTER SMALL BETA
- U+1D66 ᵦ GREEK SUBSCRIPT SMALL LETTER BETA
- U+1DE9 ◌ᷩ COMBINING LATIN SMALL LETTER BETA
- U+2C82 Ⲃ COPTIC CAPITAL LETTER VIDA
- U+2C83 ⲃ COPTIC SMALL LETTER VIDA
- U+333C ㌼ SQUARE BEETA (Japanese square katakana of ベータ bēta)
- U+A7B4 Ꞵ LATIN CAPITAL LETTER BETA
- U+A7B5 ꞵ LATIN SMALL LETTER BETA
- U+10381 𐎁 UGARITIC LETTER BETA

These characters are used only as mathematical symbols. Stylized Greek text should be encoded using the normal Greek letters, with markup and formatting to indicate text style:

- U+1D6A9 𝚩 MATHEMATICAL BOLD CAPITAL BETA
- U+1D6C3 𝛃 MATHEMATICAL BOLD SMALL BETA
- U+1D6E3 𝛣 MATHEMATICAL ITALIC CAPITAL BETA
- U+1D6FD 𝛽 MATHEMATICAL ITALIC SMALL BETA
- U+1D71D 𝜝 MATHEMATICAL BOLD ITALIC CAPITAL BETA
- U+1D737 𝜷 MATHEMATICAL BOLD ITALIC SMALL BETA
- U+1D757 𝝗 MATHEMATICAL SANS-SERIF BOLD CAPITAL BETA
- U+1D771 𝝱 MATHEMATICAL SANS-SERIF BOLD SMALL BETA
- U+1D791 𝞑 MATHEMATICAL SANS-SERIF BOLD ITALIC CAPITAL BETA
- U+1D7AB 𝞫 MATHEMATICAL SANS-SERIF BOLD ITALIC SMALL BETA
