= Betti =

Betti may refer to:

== People ==
- Betti (given name)
- Betti (surname)

== Other uses ==
- Betti number, in algebraic topology
- Betti reaction, in chemistry
- Betti's theorem, in engineering

== See also ==
- Beti (disambiguation)
- Betty (disambiguation)
