= Betti (surname) =

Betti is a surname. Notable people with the name include:

- Biagio Betti (1535–1605), Italian painter
- Emilio Betti (1890–1968), Italian jurist, philosopher and theologian
- Enrico Betti (1823–1892), Italian mathematician
- Freda Betti (1924–1979), French opera singer
- Henri Betti (1917–2005), French composer and pianist
- Laura Betti (1927–2004), Italian actress
- Liliana Betti (1937–1998), Italian screenwriter and director
- Luca Betti (born 1978), Italian rally driver
- Natale Betti (1826–1888), Italian painter
- Paulo Betti (born 1952), Brazilian stage, film and television actor
- Priscilla Betti (born 1989), French singer and actress
- Riccardo Betti (born 1963), professor of Mechanical Engineering, Physics and Astronomy at the University of Rochester
- Sigismondo Betti (1699–1777), Italian painter
- Ugo Betti (1892–1953), Italian judge and author
- Umberto Betti (1922–2009), Italian Cardinal of the Roman Catholic Church

== See also ==
- Betty (surname)
- Betti (given name)
