= Beti =

Beti may refer to:

== People ==
- Mongo Beti (1932–2001), Cameroonian writer
- Beti George (born 1939), Welsh television and radio broadcaster
- Beti Jones (1919–2006), Scottish social worker
- Beti Kamya-Turwomwe (born 1955), Ugandan businesswoman and politician
- Beti Rimac (born 1976), Croatian volleyball player
- Beti Rhys (1907–2003), Welsh bookstore owner and author
- Beti Sekulovski (born 1983), Australian tennis player
- Beti Temelkova (born 1997), Bulgarian-Israeli judoka

== Other uses ==
- Béti, a sub-prefecture of Logone Occidental Region in Chad
- Beti people, a Central African ethnic group
- Beti language, a group of Bantu languages in Central and West Africa
- Beti language (Côte d'Ivoire) or Eotile, a nearly extinct Tano language
- Beti (1964 film), a Pakistani film
- Beti (1969 film), an Indian, Hindi-language film
- Beti (TV series), a 2018 Pakistani TV show

== See also ==
- Betti (disambiguation)
- Beta (disambiguation)
