= Betty (disambiguation) =

Betty and Bettie are common diminutives for the feminine given names Elizabeth and Bethany.

Betty or Bettie may also refer to:

== Places ==
- Bettié Department, a department of the Ivory Coast
  - Bettié, a town and commune in the Ivory Coast
- Bettie, one of the communities of Down East in the U.S. state of North Carolina
- Bettie, Washington, an unincorporated community in the United States
- Betty, Kentucky, an unincorporated community in the United States
- Mount Betty, a small ridge in the Ross Dependency of Antarctica

== Arts and entertainment ==
=== Music ===
- Betty (band), a New York City band
- Betty (Helmet album), 1994
- Betty (Betty Who album), 2019
- "Betty" (AJR song), 2025
- "Betty" (Brooke Fraser song), 2010
- "Betty" (Taylor Swift song), 2020
- "Betty (Get Money)", a 2022 song by American rapper Yung Gravy, also simply referred to as "Betty"
- "Betty", a song by Chris Cummings, 2002
- "Bettie", a song by My Life with the Thrill Kill Kult from The Reincarnation of Luna, 2001

=== Other arts and entertainment ===
- "Betty" (Adventure Time), an episode of the American animated television series, Adventure Time
- Betty (comic strip), a Canadian comic strip
- Betty (film), a 1992 French film by Claude Chabrol
- Betty (musical), a British musical
- Betty (TV series), an American TV series

== Military and weaponry ==
- Betty, the Allied reporting name for Mitsubishi G4M, a Japanese World War II bomber aircraft
- Betty, the nickname for the American Mark 90 nuclear bomb
- USS Betty M. II (SP-623), a United States Navy patrol boat in commission from 1917 to 1918
- USS Lady Betty, a World War I American patrol vessel

== People ==
- Betty (surname), a surname
- Lady Elizabeth Hastings (1682–1739), philanthropist nicknamed "Lady Betty"
- Elizabeth Sugrue (c. 1740/1750–1807), Irish executioner nicknamed "Lady Betty"

== Other uses ==
- Tropical Storm Betty (disambiguation), 17 storms or typhoons
- Betty lamp, a type of lamp first used in the 18th century

== See also ==
- Bouncing Betty, a type of land mine
- Brown Betty (dessert)
- Bette (disambiguation)
- Betti (disambiguation)
