= Bettye =

Bettye is an English feminine given name. Notable people with the name include:

- Bettye Ackerman (1924–2006), American actress
- Bettye Caldwell (1924–2016), American educator and academic
- Bettye Anne Case, American mathematician
- Bettye Collier-Thomas (born 1941), American historian
- Bettye Crutcher (1939–2022), American songwriter
- Bettye Danoff (1923–2011), American golfer
- Bettye Davis (1938–2018), American politician
- Bettye Fahrenkamp (1923–1991), American politician
- Bettye Frink (1933–2025), American politician
- Bettye Washington Greene (1935–1995), American industrial research chemist
- Bettye Kimbrell (1936–2016), American quilter
- Bettye Lane (1930–2012), American photojournalist
- Bettye LaVette (born 1946), American soul singer-songwriter
- Bettye Stull (born 1931), American arts curator
- Bettye Swann (born 1944), American soul singer

== See also ==
- Betye, given name
- Bette (given name)
- Betty, given name
