= Bette (given name) =

- Gender: Female

Other names
- Related names: Elizabeth; Bettina

Bette is a given name, sometimes short for Elizabeth and Bettina, and may refer to:

== People ==
- Bette Davis (1908–1989), American actress
- Bette Franke (born 1989), Dutch fashion model
- Bette Nesmith Graham (1924–1980), inventor of liquid paper
- Bette Korber, American computational biologist
- Bette Midler (born 1945), American singer and actress
- Bette Otto-Bliesner, American earth scientist
- Bette Stephenson (1924–2019), Canadian physician and politician

== Fictional characters ==
- Bette Abney, main character in the young adult fiction novels Tiny Pretty Things and Shiny Broken Pieces
- Bette Fischer, title character of Honoré de Balzac's 1846 novel Cousin Bette and its film adaptations
- Bette Kane, a DC Comics superhero
- Bette Porter, in the television series The L-Word and its sequel The L-Word: Generation Q
- Bette Tattler, in American Horror Story: Freak Show

== See also ==
- Betti (given name)
- Betty, given name
- Bettye, given name
