= Betty (surname) =

Betty is a surname. Notable people with the surname include:

- Garry Betty (1957–2007), President and CEO of EarthLink, a large American Internet service provider
- Master Betty (1791–1874), English child actor William Henry West Betty
- Nia Faith Betty (born 2001), Canadian activist and fashion designer
- Queen Betty, early 18th century Native American tribal chief
- Sam Betty (born 1986), English rugby union player
