= Hurricane Gamma =

Category 1 Atlantic hurricane in 2020

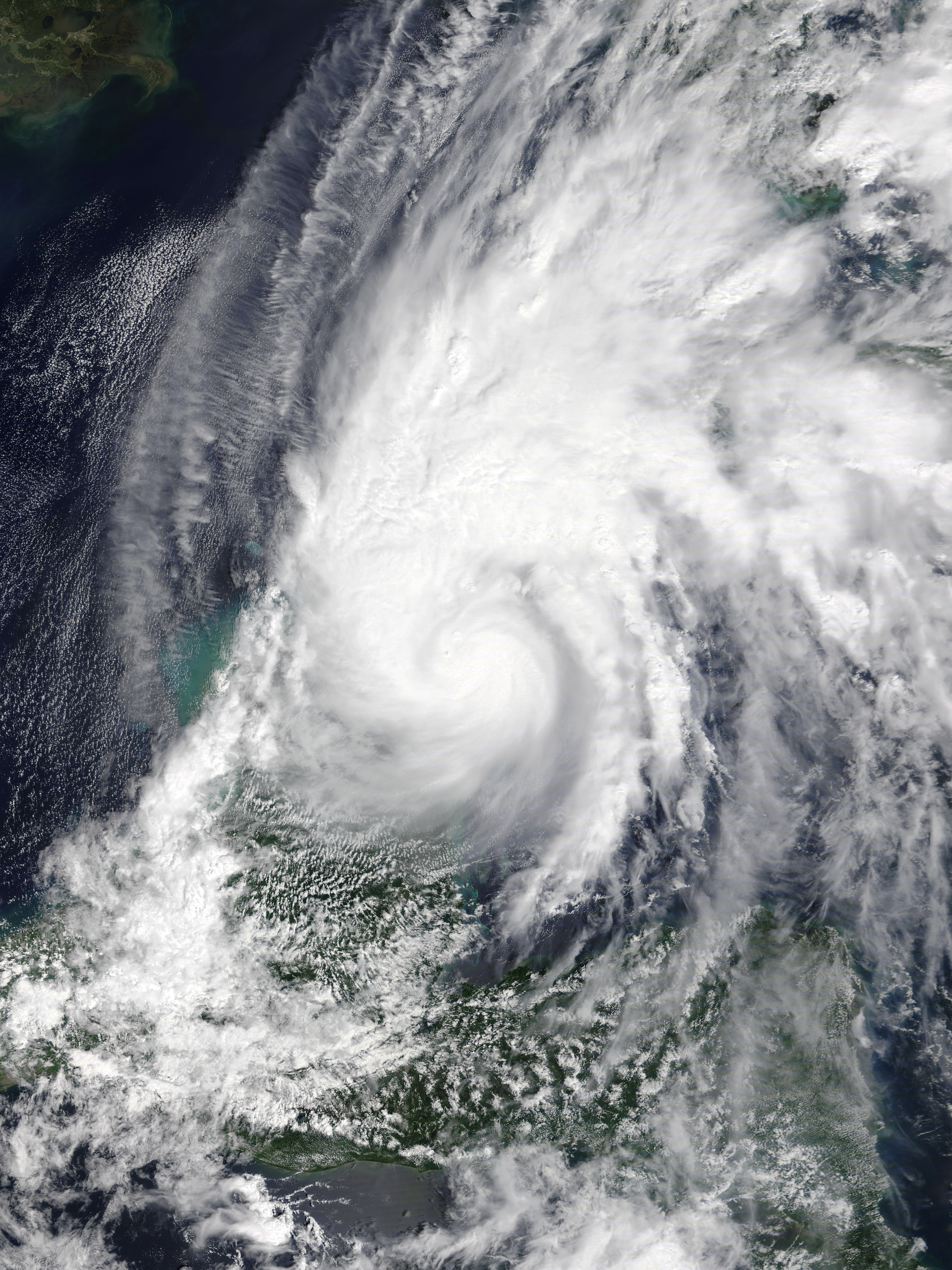
- Gamma making landfall on the Yucatán Peninsula at peak intensity on October 3

Meteorological history
- Formed: October 2, 2020
- Dissipated: October 6, 2020

Category 1 hurricane
- 1-minute sustained (SSHWS/NWS)
- Highest winds: 75 mph (120 km/h)
- Lowest pressure: 978 mbar (hPa); 28.88 inHg

Overall effects
- Fatalities: 6
- Damage: $100 million (2020 USD)
- Areas affected: Honduras, Yucatán Peninsula, Cayman Islands, Cuba, Florida
- IBTrACS
- Part of the 2020 Atlantic hurricane season

Hurricane Gamma was a tropical cyclone that brought heavy rains, flooding, and landslides to the Yucatán Peninsula in early October 2020. The twenty-fifth depression, twenty-fourth named storm and ninth hurricane of the extremely active 2020 Atlantic hurricane season, Gamma developed from a vigorous tropical wave that had been monitored as it was entering the Eastern Caribbean on September 29. The wave moved westward and slowed down as it moved into the Western Caribbean, where it began to interact with a dissipating cold front. A low formed within the disturbance on October 1 and the next day, it organized into a tropical depression. It further organized into Tropical Storm Gamma early the next day. It continued to intensify and made landfall as a minimal hurricane near Tulum, Mexico, on October 3. It weakened over land before reemerging in the Gulf of Mexico. Gamma then briefly restrengthened some before being blasted by high amounts of wind shear, causing it to weaken again. It made a second landfall as a tropical depression in Nichili, Mexico on October 6 before dissipating as it was absorbed by the approaching Hurricane Delta.

Numerous tropical cyclone watches and warnings were issued for parts of Mexico in the Yucatán Peninsula following the formation of Gamma and thousands of people were evacuated. Gamma produced strong winds, heavy rainfall, flash flooding, landslides, and mudslides to the region. At least seven fatalities have been confirmed so far. The areas affected by Gamma were affected by stronger Hurricane Delta four days after the former made landfall.

== Meteorological history ==
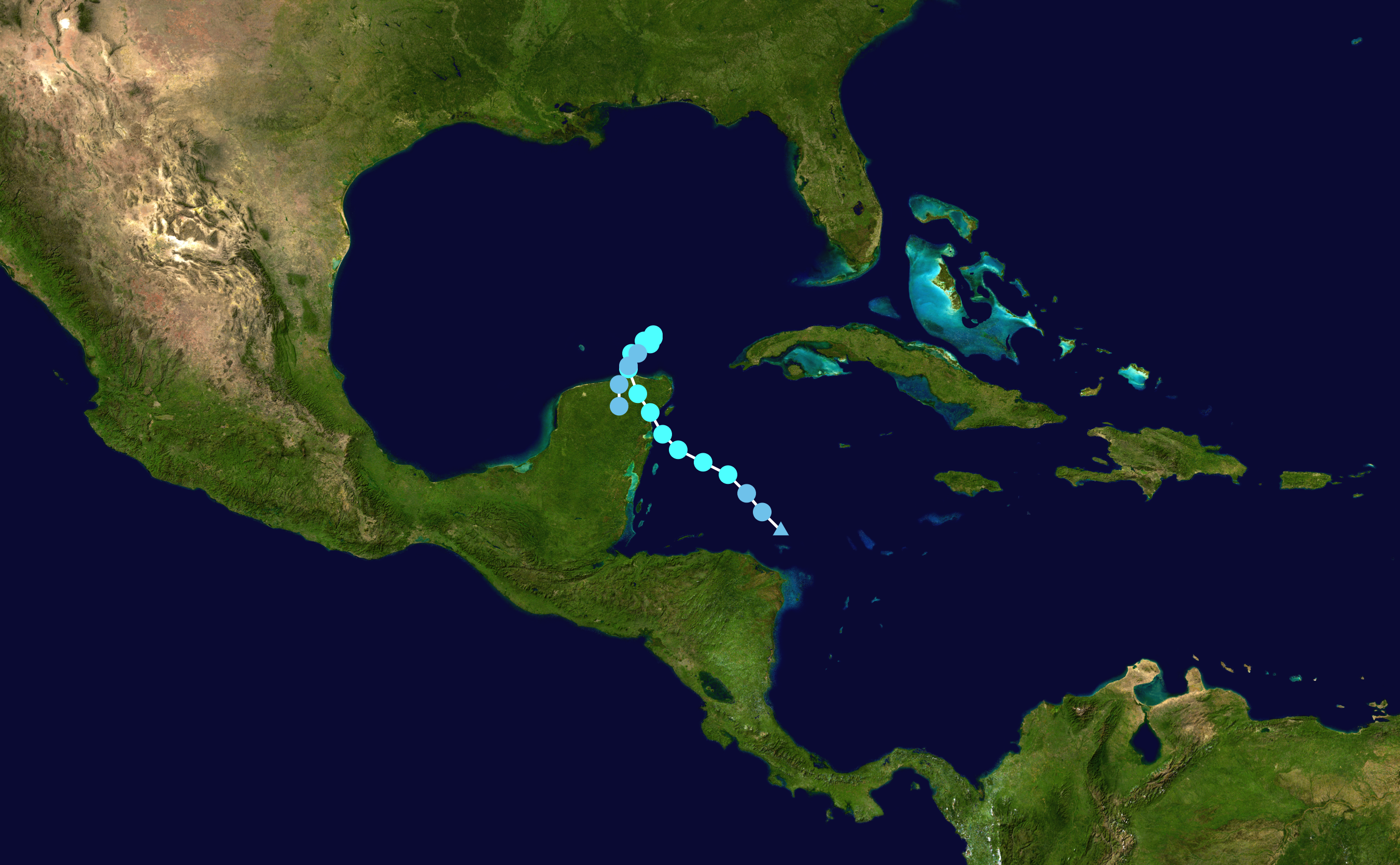
Map plotting the storm's track and intensity, according to the Saffir–Simpson scale. The Category 1 position is not depicted. (Note: The position of Gamma's Category 1 is not depicted in this graphic as it is an asynoptic point (i.e. not at the 6-hour intervals of all other points) occurring at 16:45 UTC October 3.) Map key Saffir–Simpson scale Tropical depression (≤38 mph, ≤62 km/h) Tropical storm (39–73 mph, 63–118 km/h) Category 1 (74–95 mph, 119–153 km/h) Category 2 (96–110 mph, 154–177 km/h) Category 3 (111–129 mph, 178–208 km/h) Category 4 (130–156 mph, 209–251 km/h) Category 5 (≥157 mph, ≥252 km/h) Unknown Storm type Tropical cyclone Subtropical cyclone Extratropical cyclone, remnant low, tropical disturbance, or monsoon depression

On September 29, the National Hurricane Center began to monitor a tropical wave over the Lesser Antilles for potential development as it moved into the Western Caribbean. It drifted slowly westward and remained very broad and disorganized for a couple of days. As it neared the coast of Honduras on October 1, the wave spawned a broad low pressure area and began to quickly organize over the unusually warm waters of the Western Caribbean. By 15:00 UTC on October 2, the low had become sufficiently organized to be designated as Tropical Depression Twenty-Five. The system continued to organize, and strengthened into Tropical Storm Gamma at 00:00 UTC on October 3, becoming the earliest 24th tropical or subtropical Atlantic storm on record, surpassing the old mark of October 27, set by Hurricane Beta in 2005. Gamma began to quickly intensify afterward, reaching just below hurricane strength as an eye began to form at 15:00 UTC on October 3. By 16:45 UTC that same day, Gamma had reached minimal Category 1 hurricane status and made landfall near Tulum, Quintana Roo, Mexico, at peak intensity, with 1-minute sustained winds of 75 mph (121 km/h) and a minimum central pressure of 978 mbar (28.9 inHg). Operationally, the NHC noted that Gamma was very near hurricane strength at the time of landfall, but kept it at high-end tropical storm status.

After making landfall, Gamma weakened before emerging into the Gulf of Mexico with winds of 50 mph (80 km/h) winds and a central pressure of 995 mb (29.4 inHg) on October 4. Its forward motion then slowed as a ridge developed to the north. Gamma then subsequently restrengthened to 60 mph (97 km/h) around mid-day, although this proved to be brief, as its central pressure increased and winds decreased in speed. As Gamma stalled a rapid increase in wind shear decoupled central convection by that evening, causing it to move further east than originally forecast. Gamma began to weaken shortly thereafter as it turned southwestward. Though strongly sheared, there was vigorous convection located 60 miles north of Gamma's center. Operationally, Gamma was declared post tropical at 03:00 UTC on October 5 as the convection being produced around the cyclone was assessed as being due to a sea breeze boundary. However, post-storm analysis determined that this was premature as Gamma was still producing enough convection in its northeastern quadrant to remain a tropical storm. The storm weakened to a tropical depression at 18:00 UTC on October 5 and began moving southwestward due to a building mid-level ridge to its north as well as a binary interaction with the circulation of soon-to-be Hurricane Delta. Gamma then made its final landfall at Nichili, Mexico at 03:00 UTC on October 6. Although convection redeveloped over the center at landfall, Gamma became increasingly enveloped in the circulation of nearby Hurricane Delta and it low-level circulation dissipated at 18:00 UTC as its remnants were absorbed by Delta as it passed over the Yucatán Peninsula and into the Gulf of Mexico.

== Preparations and impact ==
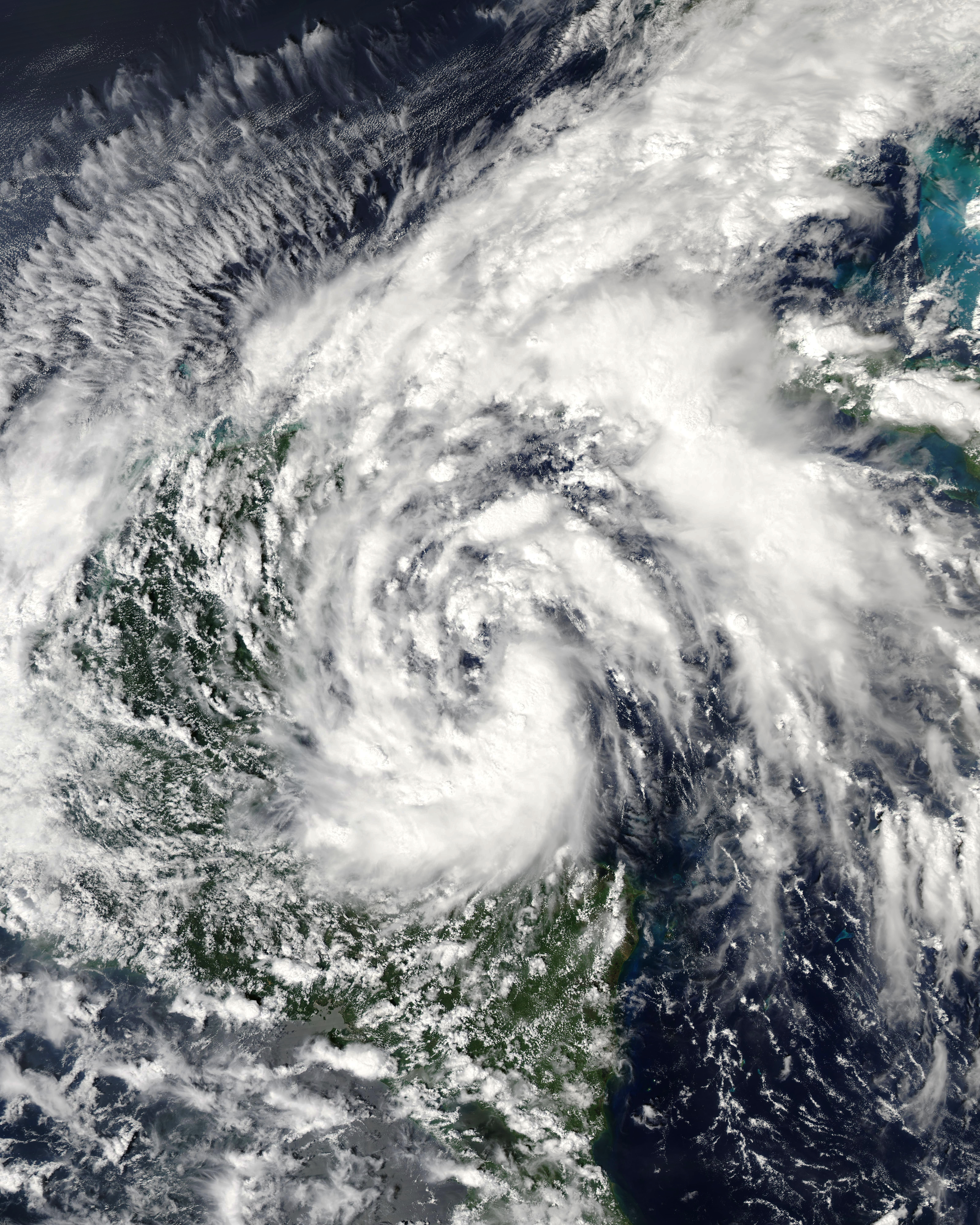
Tropical Depression Twenty-Five shortly after formation over the Gulf of Honduras on October 2

=== Mexico ===
Tropical storm watches and warnings were issued for the northeastern part of the Yucatán Peninsula when advisories were first initiated on October 2. When Gamma intensified more than originally predicted, hurricane warnings were issued from north of Punta Allen to Cancún in preparation for Gamma to become a hurricane at landfall. In Quintana Roo, 40 people in Tulum evacuated to shelters. Numerous flights were affected at the Cancún International Airport and in Cozumel. In Tabasco, roughly 3,400 people evacuated to shelters.

A weather station at Xel-Ha Park just north of the landfall point at Tulum, reported a sustained wind of 55 mph (89 km/h) and a gust to 68 mph (109 km/h) around the time of landfall. Some areas received more than 12 inches of rainfall, with over 15 inches of rain falling at Tizimin. At least 6 people died and thousands were evacuated in southeastern Mexico after Tropical Storm Gamma lashed the Yucatán Peninsula. Four of the deaths, which included two children, occurred in Chiapas after a landslide buried a home. Two other deaths occurred in Tabasco after a person was swept away by floodwaters and another drowned. Another death's cause was not specified, bringing the total number of deaths to seven. In addition, a total number of 5,000 people in Tabasco were displaced due to the storm.

More than 41,000 tourists were present in Quintana Roo at the time, with the area only recently reopened to tourism after a pandemic shutdown. 39 flights to Cancún were cancelled, and another 20 were delayed. Ferry routes were "suspended until further notice", and nearly 30 vessels were completely or partially sunk due to high waves. Fishermen and tourism service providers guarded boats to prevent further damage.

=== Elsewhere ===
Moisture associated with Gamma moved over the US state of Florida where 7 in (180 mm) of rain had fallen in the days previous to Gamma. Moderate to heavy rainfall affected the Cayman Islands, causing some flooding in some low-lying areas. Heavy rainfall also affected western Cuba where isolated spots received 6 in (150 mm) of total rainfall.

== Naming ==
The 2020 season was the second (along with 2005) in which an alphabetic list of 21 storm names had been exhausted, necessitating use of the Greek alphabet auxiliary list. In March 2021, the World Meteorological Organization replaced that auxiliary list with a new 21-name supplemental list. As a result, the name Gamma will not be used to name another Atlantic hurricane.

== See also ==
- Tropical cyclones in 2020
- List of Category 1 Atlantic hurricanes
- Hurricane Henri (1979) – Took an unusual path around the Yucatán Peninsula and affected similar areas
- Hurricane Isidore (2002) – Stalled over the Yucatán Peninsula
- Hurricane Ernesto (2012) – Caused heavy rainfall and flooding in the Yucatán Peninsula
- Tropical Storm Cristobal (2020) – Caused heavy rainfall and flooding in the Yucatán Peninsula earlier in the same season
