= Beta (Olt) =

- Location within Romania

Location
- Country: Romania
- Counties: Harghita County
- Villages: Ciba

Physical characteristics
- Source: Harghita-Băi
- Mouth: Olt
  - coordinates: 46.3840°N 25.7560°E
- Length: 10 km (6.2 mi)
- Basin size: 13 km^{2} (5.0 sq mi)

Basin features
- Progression: Olt→ Danube→ Black Sea

The Beta is a right tributary of the river Olt in Romania. It discharges into the Olt in Ciba, part of Miercurea Ciuc. Its length is 10 km (6.2 mi) and its basin size is 13 km^{2} (5.0 sq mi).
