= Nia Faith =

Canadian philanthropist and fashion designer (born 2001)

- Born: Nia Faith; October 6, 2001 (age 24); Toronto, Ontario, Canada
- Education: Howard University
- Occupations: Fashion designer, philanthropist
- Years active: 2019–present
- Website: www.sisters.is

Nia Faith (born October 6, 2001) is a Canadian entrepreneur and philanthropist. She is the co-founder of Sisters, a media and live experiences company connecting young women and girls with extraordinary women across business, sports, STEM, media, entertainment and the arts. Faith is also known for founding Révolutionnaire, which began as an inclusive dancewear company and later expanded into media, youth programming and social-impact initiatives. Faith and her sister, Justice Faith, were named to the 2024 Forbes 30 Under 30 list in Art & Style and received the 2024 Canadian Arts & Fashion Awards Changemaker Award.

Faith grew up in Toronto and trained extensively in ballet. At the age of 14, she moved to the United States to train at New York City's Joffrey Ballet School, where she was also featured in Awesomeness TV's Joffrey Elite. In 2017, Faith sustained an injury that interrupted her dance training and left her on bed rest for several months.

During her recovery, Faith began sketching and developing dancewear inspired by her own experience growing up as a Black ballerina and struggling to find apparel and accessories that matched her skin tone. She had frequently dyed her own dancewear during her training years and, after meeting Misty Copeland and learning that Copeland had faced similar challenges, began developing a line designed to offer dancers of color a wider range of skin-tone options.

In 2019, Faith began studying at Howard University in Washington, D.C. and launched Révolutionnaire during her first year at the university. The company began with apparel before expanding into skin-toned dancewear and accessories for dancers of color. Faith later graduated from Howard University with a Bachelor of Fine Arts degree.

== Career ==
Faith founded Révolutionnaire in 2019, initially developing the company around inclusive dancewear and products for dancers of color. Her sister Justice Faith later joined the company as co-founder, and the sisters expanded its work into brand collaborations, original media, community initiatives and youth-focused programming. Révolutionnaire received national attention for its work at the intersection of fashion, media and social impact, with coverage in outlets including Forbes, Women's Wear Daily, Essence, Dance Magazine and the Toronto Star.

In 2020, Faith began working with Canadian lifestyle brand Roots on a multi-part collaboration. The first collection launched in February 2021 and included a T-shirt featuring the phrase "Dreams Fuel Revolutions", which sold out within 24 hours. Proceeds from the collection supported The Black Academy, a Canadian organization supporting Black talent in the arts and entertainment industries. A second Roots collaboration followed later that year and included leather goods, apparel and accessories. Forbes later reported that the Roots collaborations sold out in stores across Canada, the United States and Taiwan.

Faith subsequently led collaborations spanning apparel, cosmetics and eyewear. Her work included a collaboration with Essie that was distributed in approximately 1,200 retail locations, alongside projects with brands including L'Oréal, Rogers and New Look. The sisters' work across products, media and live experiences led to their inclusion on the 2024 Forbes 30 Under 30 list in Art & Style.

In 2026, Faith and her sister co-founded Sisters, a media and live experiences company for young women and girls. Sisters produces original media, conversations and live experiences designed to bring young women and girls closer to women across business, sports, STEM, media, entertainment and the arts. The company focuses on the stories, decisions, lessons and advice behind women's careers and experiences, with Faith helping lead its cultural and creative direction.

== Philanthropy ==
Faith's philanthropic work has focused on young people, women and girls, disaster relief and next-generation giving. Alongside her sister, she has worked on fundraising campaigns, donation drives and live experiences supporting organizations in Canada, the United States and the Caribbean.

In 2021, Faith and her sister helped organize relief efforts following the eruption of the La Soufrière volcano in Saint Vincent and the Grenadines. Their work included a donation drive supporting communities affected by the eruption. The Canadian Arts & Fashion Awards later reported that the initiative benefited approximately 16,000 people.

Faith has also supported youth-focused charitable initiatives in Toronto. In 2024, she and Justice Faith served as inaugural co-chairs of After the Ball, a fundraising event supporting the Boost Child & Youth Advocacy Centre. The event brought together approximately 250 attendees and raised $160,000 for services supporting children and young people who had experienced abuse.

In 2025, Faith, and her sister Justice, launched RISE, a Toronto-based next-generation fundraising initiative supporting Victim Services Toronto. The inaugural RISE event, held at the Globe and Mail Centre in June 2025, raised more than $525,000 to support a therapeutic program for young victims of crime following court proceedings. The initiative was designed in part to engage a younger generation of donors in philanthropy and charitable giving.

In April 2026, Faith served alongside her sister and Julie Kim as a co-chair of the Misty Copeland Foundation's inaugural Spring Benefit. The event supported the foundation's $1 million Celebrating Misty fundraising campaign and brought together established and next-generation philanthropists in support of the foundation's work with young dancers.

== Recognition ==
Faith and her sister have received recognition for their work across entrepreneurship, fashion, media and philanthropy. In 2023, they were included in Toronto Life's annual list of rising stars. In 2024, they were named to the Forbes 30 Under 30 list in the Art & Style category for their work with Révolutionnaire. That same year, the sisters received the Changemaker Award at the Canadian Arts & Fashion Awards.
