= Beta, Ohio =

Extinct town in Ohio, United States

Coordinates: 41.501245°N 84.008754°W

Beta is an extinct town in York Township, Fulton County, Ohio, United States.

== History ==
Beta was formerly located in Henry County until land was given to create Fulton County in 1850. A post office called Beta was established in 1857, and remained in operation until 1901.
