= Tropical Storm Alpha =

Atlantic tropical storm

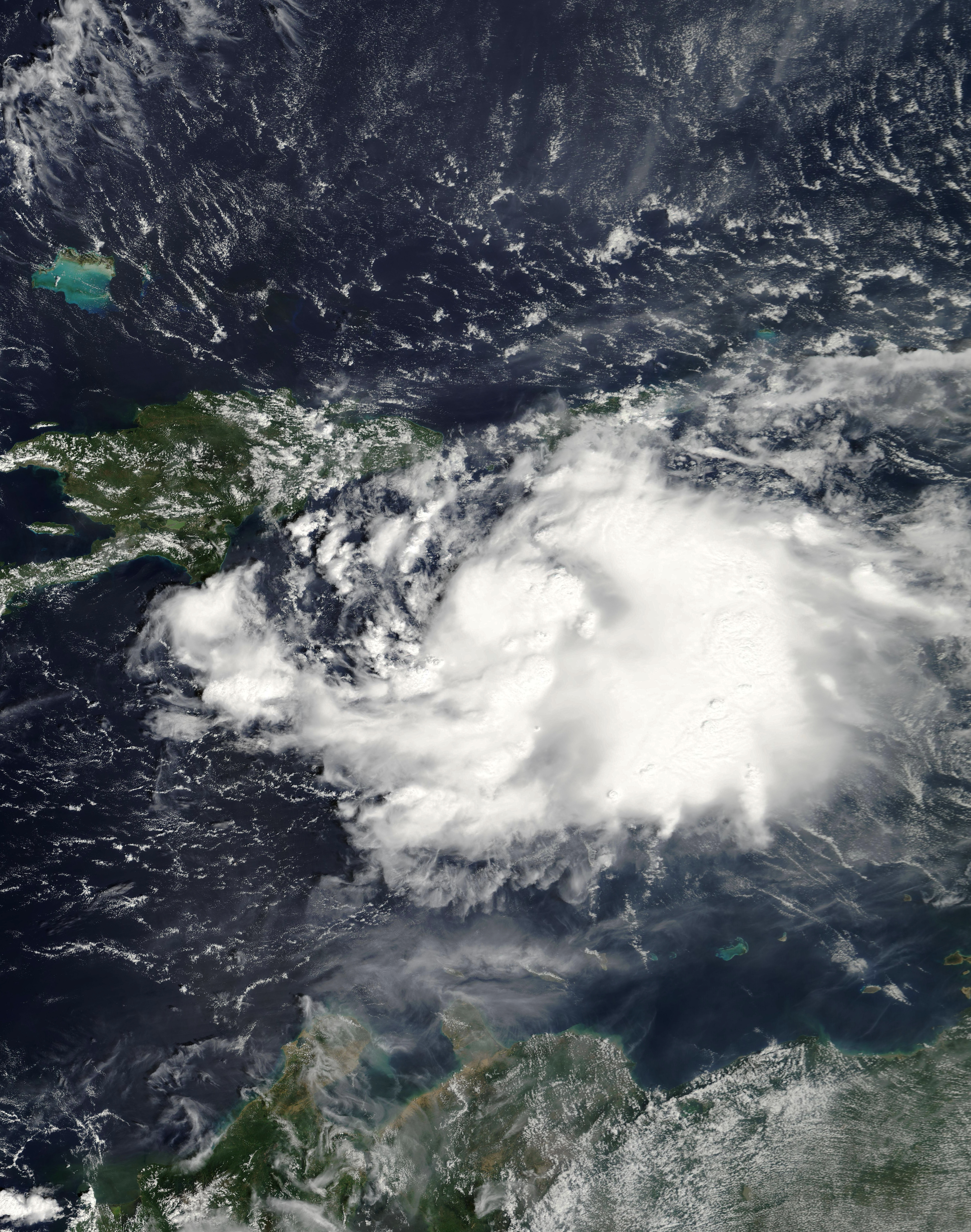
- Tropical Storm Alpha shortly after formation on October 22

Meteorological history
- Formed: October 22, 2005
- Dissipated: October 24, 2005

Tropical storm
- 1-minute sustained (SSHWS/NWS)
- Highest winds: 50 mph (85 km/h)
- Lowest pressure: 998 mbar (hPa); 29.47 inHg

Overall effects
- Fatalities: 26 total
- Damage: Unknown
- Areas affected: Hispaniola
- IBTrACS
- Part of the 2005 Atlantic hurricane season

Tropical Storm Alpha was the 23rd tropical storm of the extremely active 2005 Atlantic hurricane season. It developed from Tropical Depression Twenty-Five in the eastern Caribbean Sea on October 22, 2005. As the 21 pre-designated storm names had been exhausted, it was given the first name on the auxiliary list, which utilized the letters of the Greek alphabet. This was the first hurricane season ever to trigger this naming protocol, and the only one until the 2020 season.

During its brief life, Alpha moved west-northwestward and reached its peak intensity on October 23, but weakened as it neared landfall in the Dominican Republic that same day. Crossing the island of Hispaniola it weakened to a tropical depression, and persisted until October 24, when it dissipated. Its remnant low was absorbed by Hurricane Wilma's large circulation.

Alpha dumped torrential rain on the island of Hispaniola, making it the eighth wettest storm to impact poverty-stricken Haiti. It caused 26 deaths, 17 of them in Haiti, and all of them caused by floods and rain-related landslides. Roads were blocked for weeks and hundreds of houses were destroyed.

== Meteorological history ==
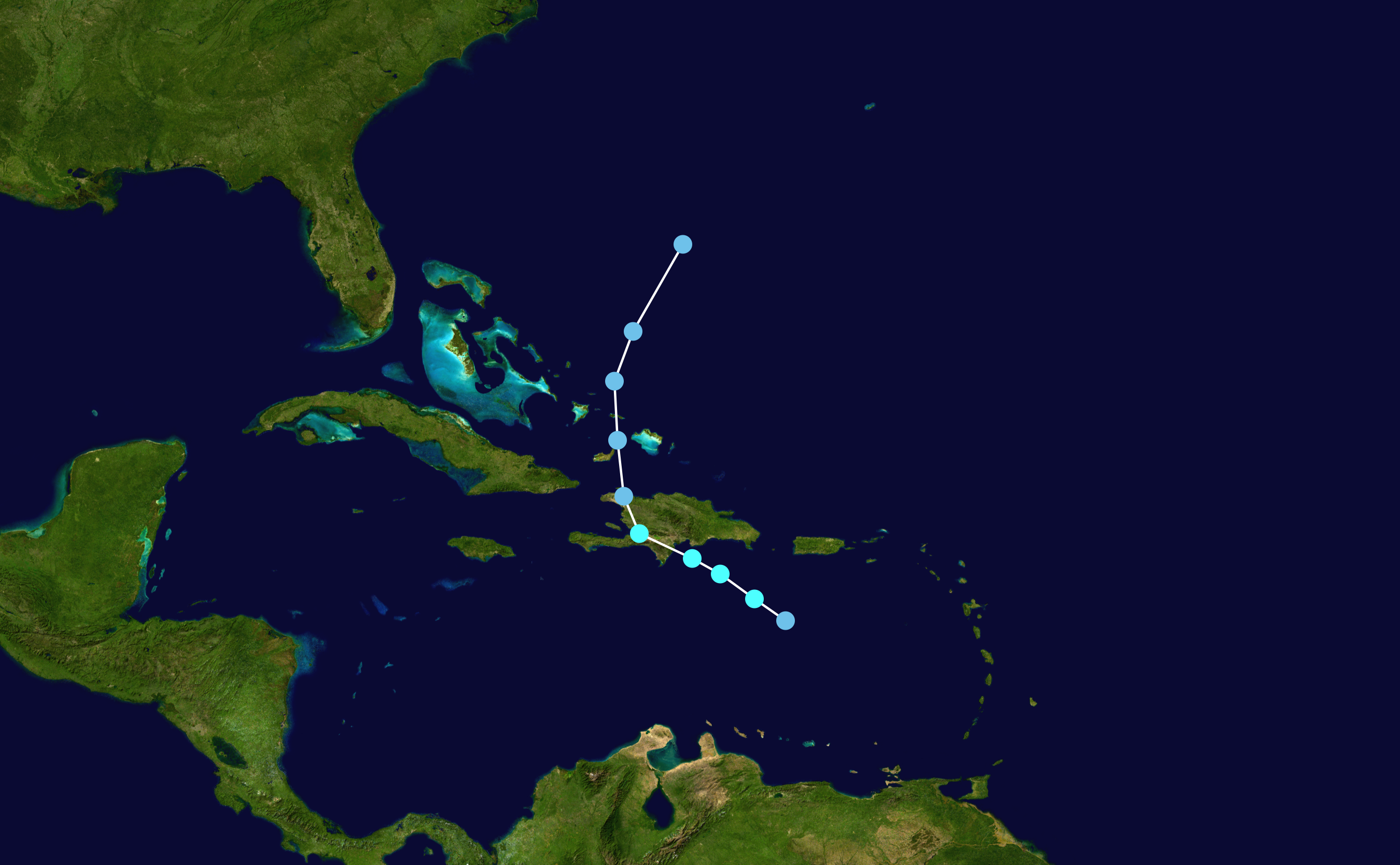
Map plotting the storm's track and intensity, according to the Saffir–Simpson scale Map key Saffir–Simpson scale Tropical depression (≤38 mph, ≤62 km/h) Tropical storm (39–73 mph, 63–118 km/h) Category 1 (74–95 mph, 119–153 km/h) Category 2 (96–110 mph, 154–177 km/h) Category 3 (111–129 mph, 178–208 km/h) Category 4 (130–156 mph, 209–251 km/h) Category 5 (≥157 mph, ≥252 km/h) Unknown Storm type Tropical cyclone Subtropical cyclone Extratropical cyclone, remnant low, tropical disturbance, or monsoon depression

Alpha's origins were from a tropical wave that developed near the Windward Islands on October 20. Satellite images indicated that a low pressure center associated with the tropical wave formed near Barbados and moved west-northwest with increasing convective activity. In an area of light wind shear, the convection increased and Doppler weather radar data from Puerto Rico detected a well-defined cyclonic circulation. On October 22, the area of low pressure organized into Tropical Depression Twenty-five, southeast of Hispaniola. Shortly thereafter, satellite imagery indicated that a closed circulation had developed, and the associated convection had started banding. Later that same day, the depression had organized enough to be upgraded to Tropical Storm Alpha; this was the first time the National Hurricane Center had to use a Greek name for an Atlantic hurricane.

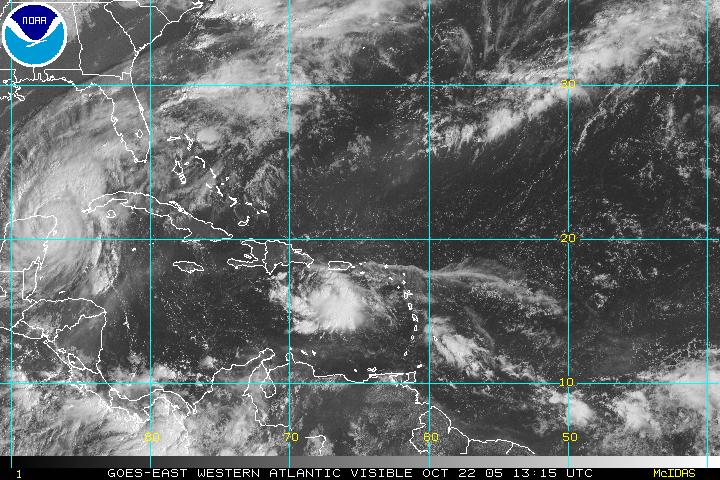
Hurricane Wilma (left) and Tropical Depression 25 (right) on October 22

When Alpha came within the Doppler weather radar range of Puerto Rico, the radar suggested that an eyewall-like feature had developed. Alpha was tracking along the southwest edge of a subtropical ridge. With nearby Hurricane Wilma's large circulation, Alpha was experiencing strong southerly flow from Wilma. Alpha, with its small circulation, was then faced with the mountainous terrain of Hispaniola, which led forecasters to believe Alpha was soon to dissipate. Shortly after Alpha reached its peak intensity on October 23 its wind decreased. While convection remained in bands, the low level circulation was disrupted by land. This left the center ill-defined and difficult to locate.

Late on October 23, Alpha made landfall in Hispaniola, quickly decreasing in intensity as it did so. After making landfall, the storm weakened, leaving it just between tropical storm and tropical depression status. Because of the weakening, and the strong southerly flow from nearby Hurricane Wilma, it was hard to determine whether a low-level circulation was present. However, satellite imagery suggested that a new center had developed over open waters to the north of Hispaniola. It was downgraded to a tropical depression early the next day, now re-emerging over open waters. The storm soon developed an elongated center of circulation which indicated that the system was weakening. On October 24 the low-level center had completely dissolved, and only a small area of convective activity persisted. Thus, the system had dissipated, and was a remnant low pressure system when the National Hurricane Center issued their last advisories of Alpha. Shortly thereafter, the remnant low was absorbed into the circulation of Hurricane Wilma on October 25.

== Preparations ==
On October 22, the National Hurricane Center issued a tropical storm warning for the island of Hispaniola and a tropical storm watch for Turks and Caicos Islands and the southeastern Bahamas. The tropical storm watch was quickly upgraded to a tropical storm warning. In the Dominican Republic, authorities ordered the evacuation of at least 30,000 people living in areas where flooding was possible. On October 22 and 23, the Haitian government ordered level 1 and then level 2 alerts for the county in anticipation of Tropical Storm Alpha's rainfall. Haiti was already experiencing flooding from Hurricane Wilma's passage between October 8 and 19, so the threat of more rainfall was particularly dire. The country's Centre National de Meteorologie issued weather bulletins through existing media distribution channels with clear instructions on how residences should prepare for floods and landslides. The local government of Sud-Est ordered the evacuation of its capital city, Jacmel. The national government mobilized personnel and resources of the Direction of Civil Protection, the Secrétariat Permanent de Gestion des Risques et des Désastres (SPGRD), and the National Police to pre-arranged Emergency Operation Centres.

== Impact ==
Country	Total deaths
Dominican Republic	9
Haiti	17
Totals	26
Source: The NHC's Tropical Cyclone Report

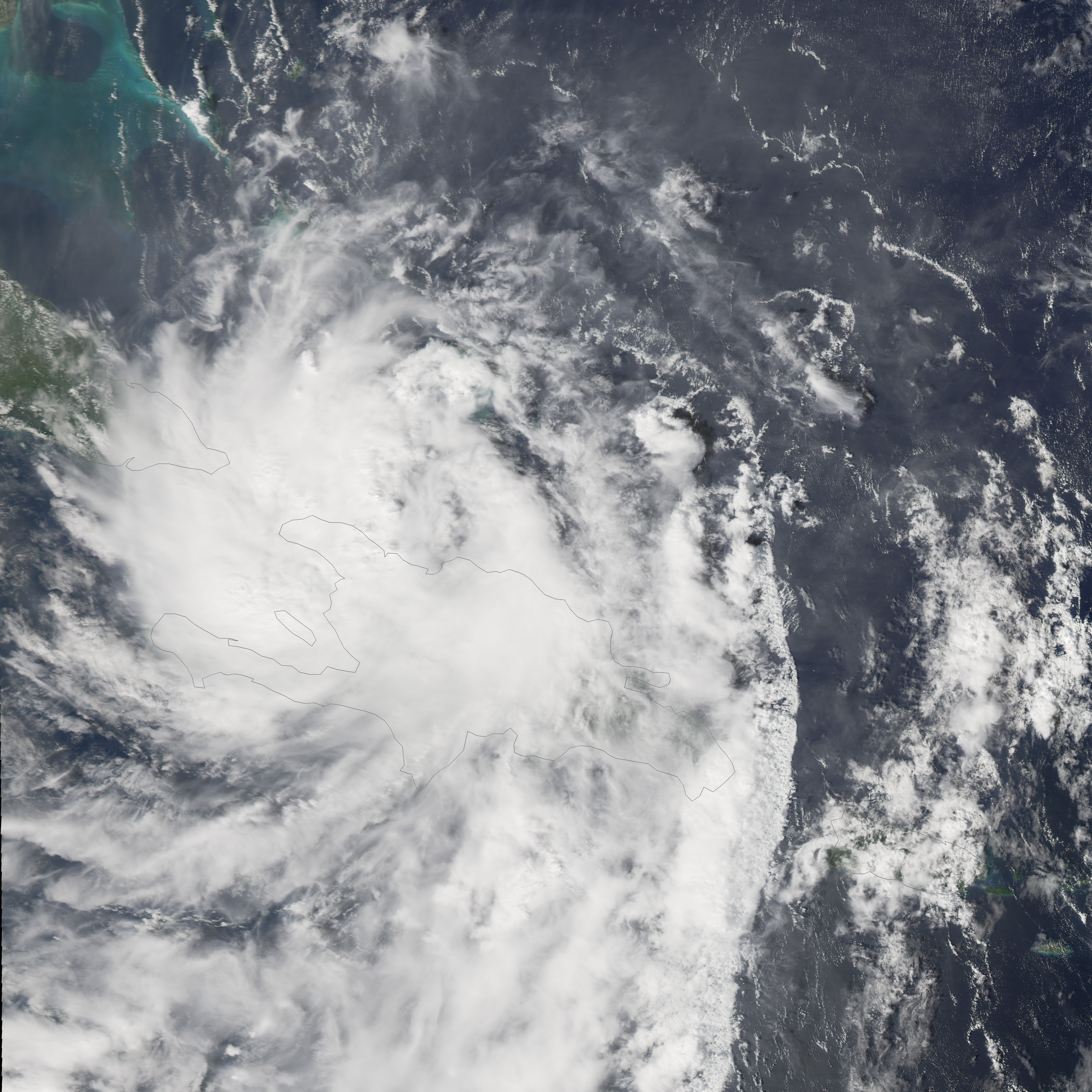
Tropical Storm Alpha a few hours after landfall in Dominican Republic on October 24

Although the storm's circulation technically made landfall near Barahona in the Dominican Republic, the bulk of its impact occurred in the country's poorer neighbor, Haiti. When Alpha arrived on Hispaniola it brought between 4 inches (101 mm) and 7.9 in (201 mm) of rain which triggered floods and landslides. The road between Port-au-Prince and Sud was closed at Grand-Goâve, Ouest. In the coastal city of Léogâne near Port-au-Prince, bridges were closed to cars but not to pedestrians. Surging rivers east of Marigot and west of Jacmel closed roads in that region, and the main road between Jérémie and Les Cayes was also closed. Elsewhere in the country, landslides temporarily blocked several other major roads. Gonâve Island, which had been suffering a brutal drought, was stricken by floods which overwhelmed and washed away pipes of the water draining system in Nan Baré.

Damages in Haiti were mostly confined to the Ouest, Sud-Est, and Grand'Anse departments. In Haiti, 17 people died. Two drowned when a river overflowed in Grande Anse and two more died after being electrocuted during flooding, one in the Port-au-Prince suburb of Carrefour and the other in the southern town of Jacmel. The rest of the deaths were the results of landslides and flooding in various areas in the country. Across the country, 243 houses were destroyed, and 191 more were damaged.

Nine people were killed in the Dominican Republic: two fishermen went missing at sea during the storm and the others were swept away by flood waters when rivers burst their banks in Guaricanos and Puerto Plata. Otherwise, the damage in the Dominican Republic was minimal.

The Haitian government did not request international assistance, although The United Nations Stabilization Mission in Haiti (MINUSTAH), the United Nations Development Programme (UNDP) and the Haitian Red-Cross, which were already working in Haiti, took on some supporting roles. In response to local flooding, the Jacmel Regional branch of the Red Cross distributed an additional 400 water purification tablets, 11 boxes of high-energy biscuits, and 10 boxes of body soap.

== Naming and records ==
As all of the 21 pre-designated hurricane names for the season were exhausted after Hurricane Wilma, the Greek alphabet was used and the storm was designated Alpha once it reached tropical storm status. The name Alpha had been used before in the Atlantic, for a 1972 subtropical storm. However, 2005 was the first tropical or subtropical storm to be assigned a Greek-alphabet name from the auxiliary list. The next one to be so named was Subtropical Storm Alpha in 2020.

At the time, it was thought that Alpha was the 22nd storm of the season, and so was the storm which broke the record for most storms in a single Atlantic hurricane season set in 1933. However post-season analysis revealed that there was also a previously unnoticed subtropical storm on October 4, which made Alpha the 23rd storm of the season.

Alpha's record-setting formation date as the season's 23rd tropical or subtropical storm would stand until 2020. It was broken by Tropical Storm Beta, which formed on September 18.

== See also ==
- Lists of Atlantic hurricanes
- Timeline of the 2005 Atlantic hurricane season
