= Beta angle =

Angle between the orbital plane of a satellite and the vector to the sun

Beta angle ($\boldsymbol{\beta}$)

In orbital mechanics, the beta angle ($\boldsymbol{\beta}$) is the angle between a satellite's orbital plane around Earth and the geocentric position of the Sun. The beta angle determines the percentage of time that a satellite in low Earth orbit (LEO) spends in direct sunlight, absorbing solar radiation. For objects launched into orbit, the solar beta angle of inclined and sun-synchronous orbits depend on launch altitude, inclination, and time.

The beta angle does not define a unique orbital plane: all satellites in orbit with a given beta angle at a given orbital altitude have the same exposure to the Sun, even though they may be orbiting in different planes around Earth.

The beta angle varies between +90° and −90°, and the direction in which the satellite orbits its primary body determines whether the beta angle sign is positive or negative. An imaginary observer standing on the Sun defines a beta angle as positive if the satellite in question orbits in a counterclockwise direction and negative if it revolves clockwise. The maximum amount of time that a satellite in a normal LEO mission can spend in Earth's shadow occurs at a beta angle of 0°. A satellite in such an orbit spends at least 59% of its orbital period in sunlight.

== Light and shadow ==
The degree of orbital shadowing an object in LEO experiences is determined by that object's beta angle. An object launched into an initial orbit with an inclination equal to the complement of the Earth's inclination to the ecliptic results in an initial beta angle of 0 degrees ($\beta$ = 0°) for the orbiting object. This allows the object to spend the maximum possible amount of its orbital period in the Earth's shadow, and results in extremely reduced absorption of solar energy. At a LEO of 280 kilometers, the object is in sunlight through 59% of its orbit (approximately 53 minutes in Sunlight, and 37 minutes in shadow.) On the other extreme, an object launched into an orbit parallel to the terminator results in a beta angle of 90 degrees ($\beta$ = 90°), and the object is in sunlight 100% of the time. An example would be a polar orbit initiated at local dawn or dusk on an equinox. Beta angle can be controlled to keep a satellite as cool as possible (for instruments that require low temperatures, such as infrared cameras) by keeping the beta angle as close to zero as possible, or, conversely, to keep a satellite in sunlight as much as possible (for conversion of sunlight by its solar panels, for solar stability of sensors, or to study the Sun) by maintaining a beta angle as close to +90 or -90 as possible.

== Determination and application of beta angles ==
The value of a solar beta angle for a satellite in Earth orbit can be found using the equation

$$\beta=\sin^{-1}[\cos(\Gamma)\sin(\Omega)\sin(i)-\sin(\Gamma)\cos(\epsilon)\cos(\Omega)\sin(i)+\sin(\Gamma)\sin(\epsilon)\cos(i)]$$

where $\Gamma$ is the ecliptic true solar longitude, $\Omega$ is the right ascension of ascending node (RAAN), $i$ is the orbit's inclination, and $\epsilon$ is the obliquity of the ecliptic (approximately 23.45 degrees for Earth at present). The RAAN and inclination are properties of the satellite's orbit, and the solar longitude is a function of Earth's position in orbit around the Sun (approximately linearly proportional to day of year relative to the vernal equinox).

The above discussion defines the beta angle of satellites orbiting the Earth, but a beta angle can be calculated for any orbiting three body system: the same definition can be applied to give the beta angle of other objects. For example, the beta angle of a satellite in orbit around Mars, with respect to the Earth, defines how much of the time the satellite has a line of sight to the Earth - that is, it determines how long the Earth is shining on the satellite and how long the Earth is blocked from view. That same satellite also will have a beta angle with respect to the Sun, and in fact it has a beta angle for any celestial object one might wish to calculate one for: any satellite orbiting a body (i.e. the Earth) will be in that body's shadow with respect to a given celestial object (like a star) some of the time, and in its line-of-sight the rest of the time. Beta angles describing non-geocentric orbits are important when space agencies launch satellites into orbits around other bodies in the Solar System.

== Importance in spaceflight ==
When the Space Shuttle was in service on missions to the International Space Station, the beta angle of the space station's orbit was a crucial consideration; periods referred to as "beta cutout", during which the shuttle could not safely be launched to the ISS, were a direct result of the beta angle of the space station at those times. When the orbiter was in-flight (not docked to ISS) and it flew to a beta angle greater than 60 degrees, the orbiter went into "rotisserie" mode, and slowly rotated around its X-axis (nose to tail axis), for thermal regulation reasons. For flights to ISS, the shuttle could launch during an ISS beta cutout if the ISS would be at a beta less than 60 degrees at dock, and throughout the docked phase. Therefore, the mission duration affected launch timing when the beta cutout dates were approaching.

== See also ==
- International Space Station
- Low Earth orbit
- Launch window
