= Garry Betty =

American businessman

- Born: March 4, 1957; Huntsville, Alabama, U.S.
- Died: January 2, 2007 (aged 49); Atlanta, Georgia, U.S.
- Education: Georgia Institute of Technology
- Occupations: CEO and President of EarthLink (1996–2007)
- Spouse: Kathy Betty (?-Present)
- Relatives: Rena Lane (sister)

Charles Garrett "Garry" Betty (March 4, 1957 – January 2, 2007) was President and CEO of EarthLink, a large American Internet service provider, from 1996 until his death. During his leadership of EarthLink, Betty grew the customer base from just under 100,000 members to over 5,000,000.

== Early life and education ==
Betty was born in Huntsville, Alabama and grew up in Columbus, Georgia. Betty graduated from Columbus High School in 1975 He then attended the Georgia Institute of Technology in Atlanta, Georgia where he received a bachelor's degree in chemical engineering in 1979.

== Career ==
Betty worked for IBM, and received the IBM President's Award in 1982 for his work on the original IBM PC.

Betty subsequently became president and CEO of Digital Communications Associates and for some time he was the New York Stock Exchange's youngest listed CEO.

== Awards ==
Betty received Young Alumnus of the Year honors from the Georgia Institute of Technology in 1993 and was inducted into the Georgia Technology Hall of Fame in 2005.

== Cancer diagnosis and death ==
EarthLink reported in a press release on November 21, 2006 (also reported by major news agencies including the Wall Street Journal) that Betty had been diagnosed with a serious form of cancer which required him to take an undetermined leave of absence. The company announced that the Board of Directors named Mike Lunsford, Vice-President of Voice and Access, as interim CEO. EarthLink announced on January 3, 2007, that Betty had died at the age of 49 from complications of adrenal cortical cancer.
