= BETA UAS =

- Company Type: Private
- Industry: Unmanned aerial vehicle
- Founded: 2016
- Headquarter: Bandung, Indonesia
- Products: various drones and engineering product
- Service: repair, lease, customization, product design
- Website: https://www.beta-uas.id/

PT. Bentara Tabang Nusantara Unmanned Aircraft Solutions (BETA UAS) is a company based in Bandung, Indonesia that develops and manufactures unmanned aerial vehicles (UAVs). This company was established in 2016 by a group of ITB graduates in aerospace engineer, starting as drone service provider company. In 2017, the company started partnership and joint research with universities and other companies. The company focused on designing, developing, manufacturing and selling their own product in 2018, with 18 drone configurations to date. The company has experience in building unmanned aircraft for research and military purposes and now is focusing more on meeting the industrial needs of UAS. Their drones have entered service in Indonesia, both on governmental agency and private sector for aerial mapping, inspection and survey, emergency response, light cargo delivery and military.

In 2024, BETA UAS received the 2023 Technology Pioneer (Rintek) Award from the Ministry of Industry of Indonesia, underscores the company's dedication to advancing drone technology and its vital role in supporting the Industry 4.0 initiative in Indonesia. They also chosen as the top ten startups during Startup Studio Indonesia, a collaborative effort supported by Indonesia's Ministry of Communication and Informatics in collaboration with IBM in supporting Indonesian tech startup founders to achieve product-market fit. In 2025, BETA UAS was ranked as top three start up company during SEMESTA AI, an event held by Lintasarta Group to empower AI-driven startups across various sectors. BETA UAS was highlighted as one of the most adaptive drone manufacturer in Indonesia, capable to create a custom product design in 3–6 months. They also secured 1st place in Startup Track category during ASTRANAUTS 2025, an event to strengthen Indonesia's technology and digital ecosystem held by Astra Group.

== Products ==
BETA UAS manufactures the following products:

=== Military ===
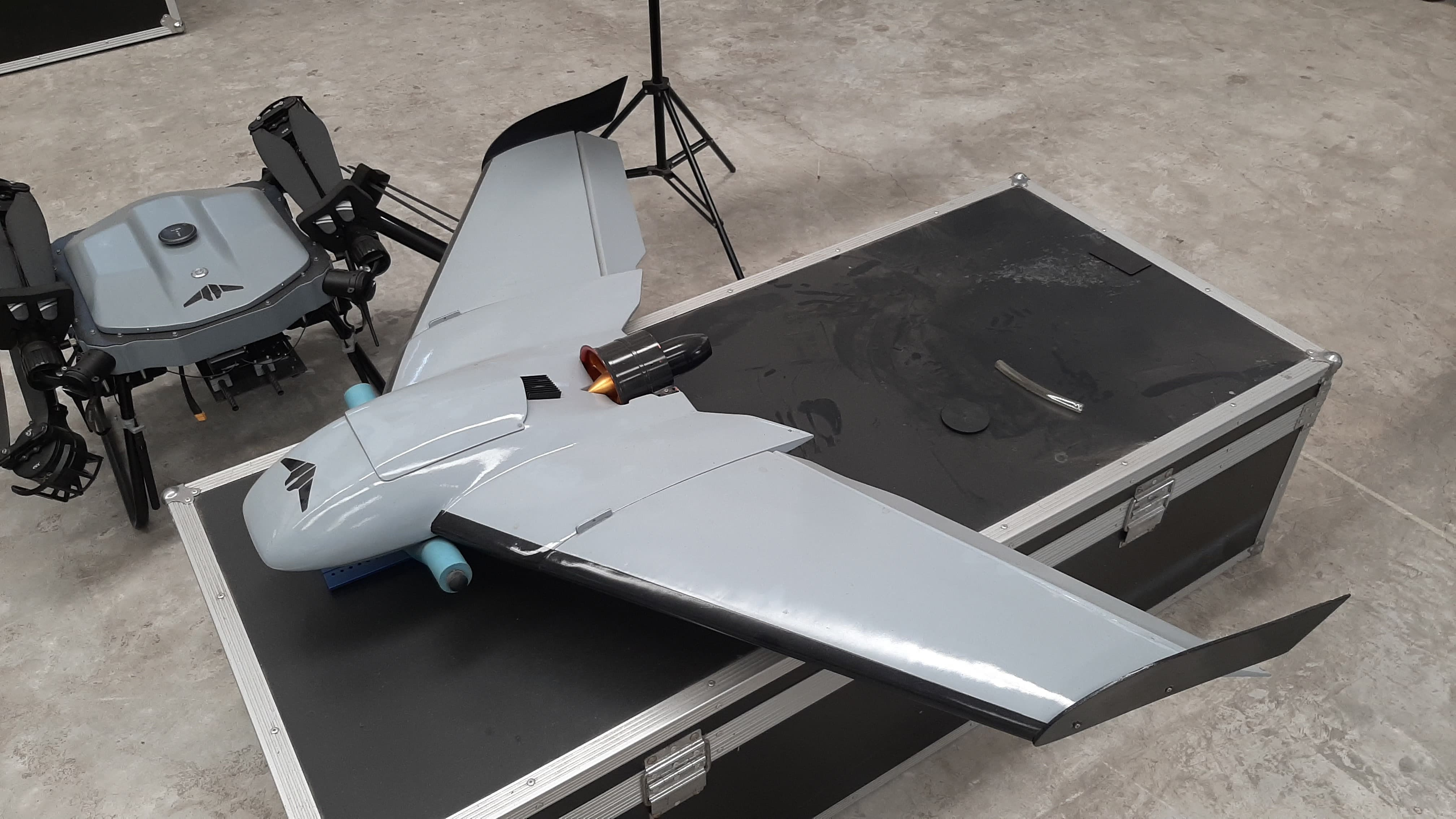
Minibe loitering munition version with electric ducted motor (IRIS seen behind)

==== Minibe ====
The first drone developed by BETA UAS. Originally designed as mapping drone with single pusher propeller, it was later developed into swarm-capable loitering munition with electric ducted-fan propulsion.

==== Ruppel ====
Ruppel was unveiled during Indo Defence 2022. It was a hybrid VTOL designed to carry two 60mm mortar or one 81mm mortar made by Pindad.

=== Civilian/Multi-purpose ===
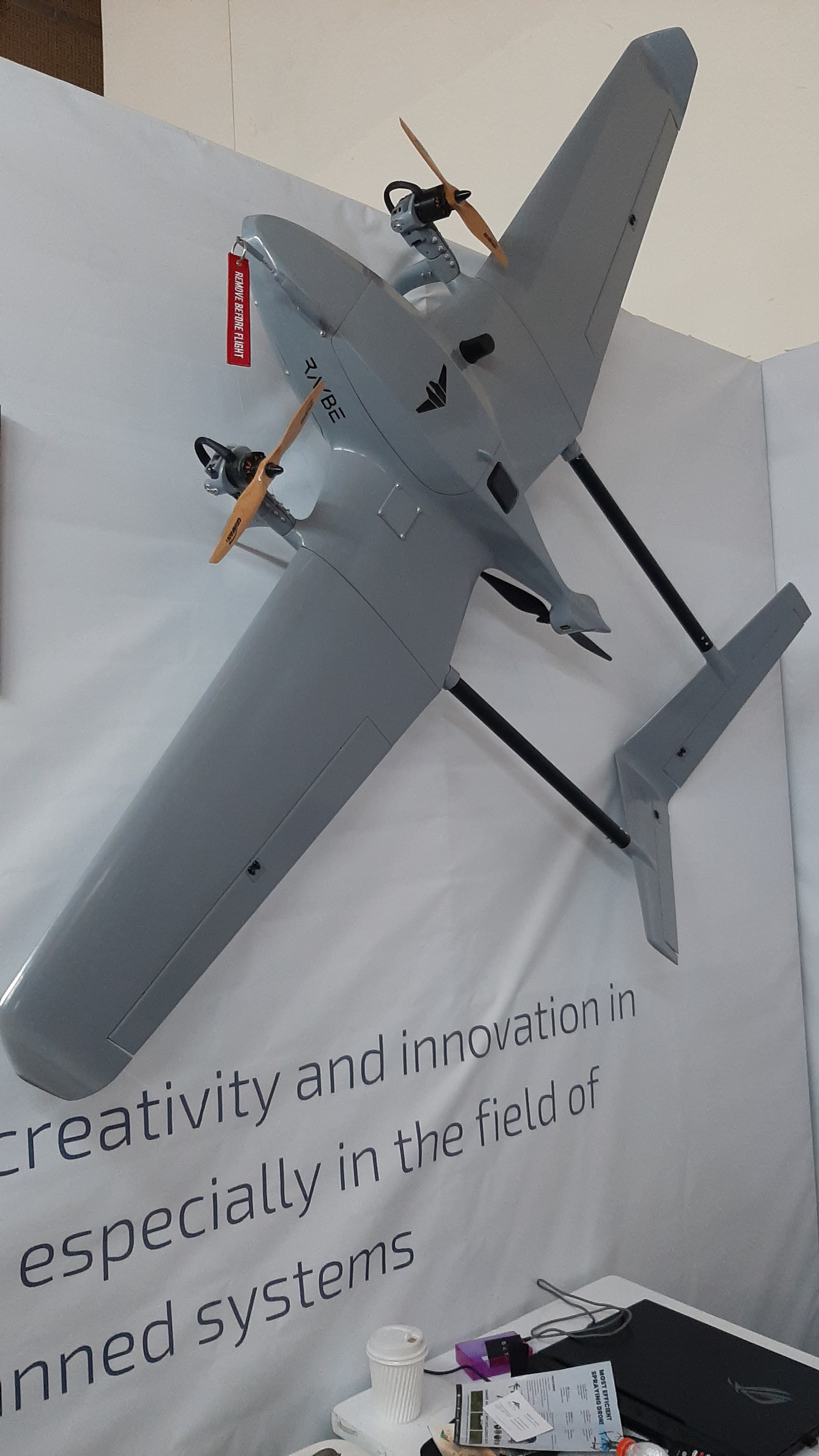
Raybe during Indonesia Drone Expo 2023

==== Feia ====
Feia is a quadcopter agricultural sprayer drone with 16L tank capacity.

==== Iris ====
Iris is a quadrotor drone with multifunction capability depends on sensor carried, include inspecting, survey, and spectrum analysis. With 7 kg payload capacity, it could also utilized as light cargo drone.

==== Lios ====
Lios is a quadrotor drone with multifunction capability depends on sensor carried, include inspecting, survey, and spectrum analysis. It was designed with unique folding mechanism compact enough to be carried on someone's back.

==== Raybe ====
Raybe is small VTOL drone designed with dual tilt-rotor on its wings and a below facing rotor on its tail for complex aerial mapping mission in a tight space.

==== Omnibe ====
Omnibe is a wide area surveillance drone with hybrid-VTOL configuration. It is the first Indonesian drone exported to Australia.

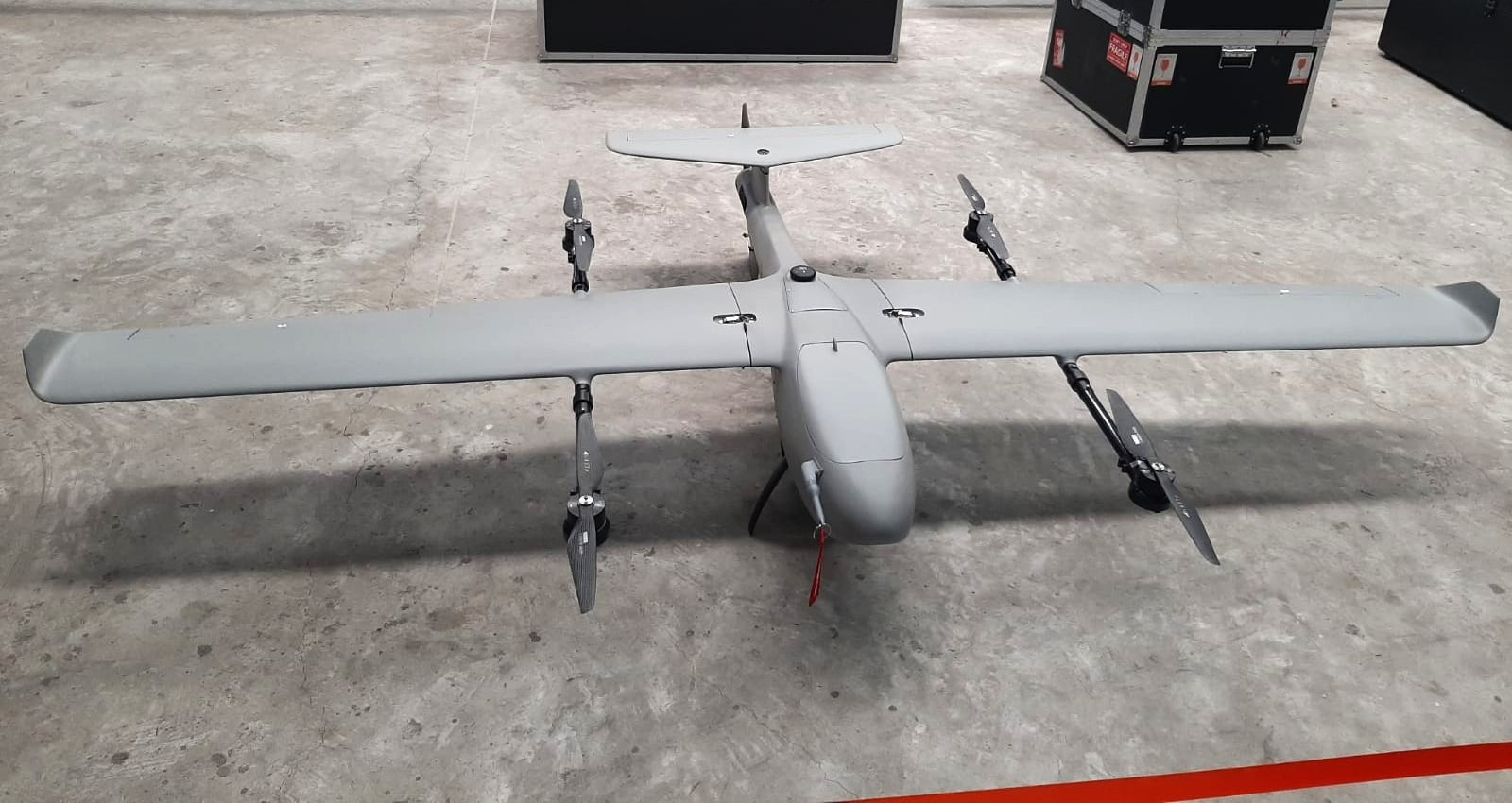
Omnibe during operator training in 2024

Characteristic of BETA UAS drones
| Parameter | Feia | Lios | Iris | Minibe | Raybe | Ruppel | Omnibe |
|---|---|---|---|---|---|---|---|
| Role | Sprayer | Multipurpose | | Loitering munition | Mapping | Airstrike | Surveillance |
| Form factor | Quadcopter | | | Flying wing | Hybrid fixed-wing VTOL | | |
| Dimension (m) | 1,8 x 1,35 x 0,63 | 1,46 x 1,46, 0,39 | 1,55 x 1,55 0,54 | 0,8 x 1,3 | 1,82 x 1,27 | 3,9 x 2,3 | 2,7 x 1,5 |
| MTOW (kg) | 36,5 | 13 | 25 | 6 | 5,2 | 30 | 13,5 |
| Payload (kg) | 16 | 3 | 7 | 0,5 | 0,5 | 6 | 2 |
| Speed (m/s) | 7 | 8 | 8 | 250 | 22 | 22 | 30 |
| Flight time (minutes) | 12 | 45 | 45 | 15 | 50 | 90 | 150 |

=== Customized Drones ===
BETA UAS also provide drone customization services for customer with specific needs.

== Partnership ==
- Development: BETA UAS collaborated with National Research and Innovation Agency (BRIN), Indonesian National Armed Forces (TNI), Bandung Institute of Technology (ITB), PT. Pindad and several local partners for drone and components development. In 2020, BETA UAS collaborated with ITB and Padjajaran University in developing bag-valve-mask ventilator to help lessening the physical burden of healthcare worker during COVID-19 pandemic in Bandung. In 2024, BETA UAS collaborated with IBM to develop a visual AI inspection system that could be implemented in various industry using IBM Maximo.
- Distribution: BETA UAS collaborated with Terra Drone from Japan as their overseas distributor and several other local companies as their local distribution.
- Operation: BETA UAS collaborated with Indonesia Airnav and Rohde & Schwartz utilizing Iris drone as a platform to carry EVSD1000 VHF/UHF NAV/Drone Analyzer to inspect airport's navigation system. BETA UAS was also chosen by State Electricity Company (PT. PLN) for electricity distribution system inspection, and PT. Pos Indonesia for developing Nusantara Logistic Hub at the new capital city, Nusantara, East Kalimantan. Drone Hand Pty Ltd, a modular livestock and land management platform based in Victoria, which collaborates with BETA for livestock monitoring operation, offering Omnibe as their 'Extended Package'.

== See also ==
- Badan Riset dan Inovasi Nasional
- Institut Teknologi Bandung
- Tentara Nasional Indonesia
- PT. Pindad
