= Beti Jones =

British social worker (1919–2006)

Beti Jones (1919–2006) was a Scottish social worker. She was awarded Commander of the British Empire (CBE), and transformed the Scottish legal system pertaining to children. She was the first social work officer in Scotland and she established the first hearing system for children.

== Early life ==
Beti Jones was born in Wales.

She was the first woman in her family to attend university at the University of Wales. She achieved a BA in History.

== Career ==
She taught for two years. From 1943-1949, she was South Wales Organiser for the National Association of Girls’ Clubs.

During the Second World War she helped refugees in Germany, and worked as a youth Education Officer for the Allied Control Commission for two years. Before settling in Scotland, she worked as Children’s Officer (1949-1968) and she was well known for her humanity.

In 1968, she became the first women Chief Adviser on Social Work for the Scottish Office. Throughout her career, she improved the child court system. Instead of attending adult courts, children got special panels of non lawyers. This system of hearings is used in Scotland and spread around the world.

She aimed to promote community service, encouraging psychiatric support in the community. In the Aberfan disaster when a coal mine slag heap destroyed a primary school, she was one of the first responders helping affected families. She provided intensive training for senior civil servants.

Jones worked to enhance child welfare in the UK with the Child Poverty Action Group. She was a manager of social work and was recognized as a Commander British Empire (CBE).
