= Betti (given name) =

Betti is a given name. Notable people with the name include:

- Betti Alisjahbana (born 1960), Indonesian business executive
- Betti Alver (1906–1989), Estonian poet
- Betti-Sue Hertz, American art curator and art historian
- Betti Sheldon (1935–2000), American politician

== See also ==
- Bette (given name)
- Betty, given name
