= Tropical Storm Beta (2020) =

Atlantic tropical storm

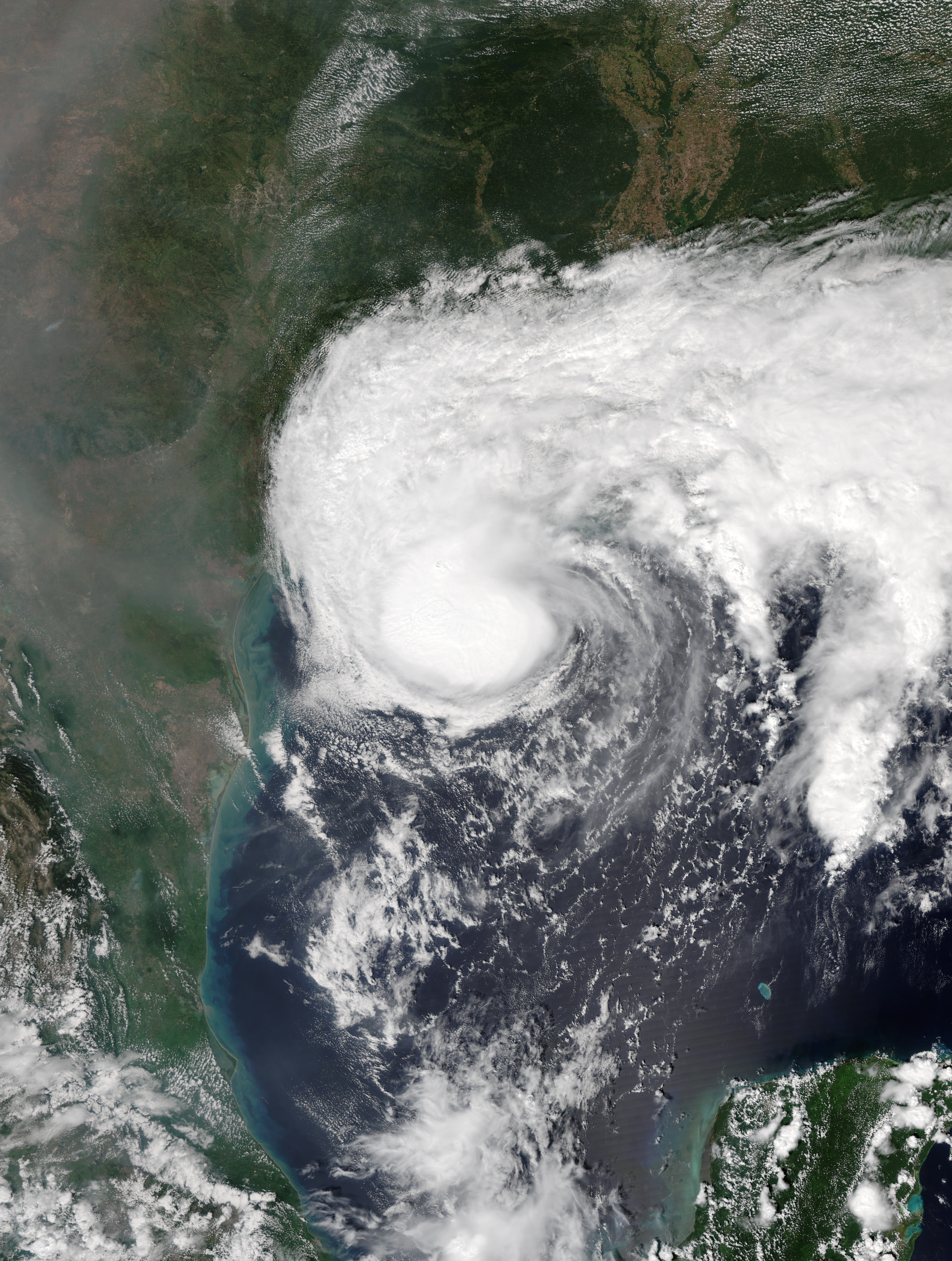
- Tropical Storm Beta at peak intensity east of Texas on September 20

Meteorological history
- Formed: September 17, 2020
- Extratropical: September 25, 2020
- Dissipated: September 25, 2020

Tropical storm
- 1-minute sustained (SSHWS/NWS)
- Highest winds: 65 mph (100 km/h)
- Lowest pressure: 993 mbar (hPa); 29.32 inHg

Overall effects
- Fatalities: 1 total
- Damage: ≥$225 million (2020 USD)
- Areas affected: Mexico, Gulf Coast of the United States, Southeastern United States
- Part of the 2020 Atlantic hurricane season

Tropical Storm Beta was a tropical cyclone that brought heavy rainfall, flooding, and severe weather to the Southeastern United States in September 2020. The twenty-fourth tropical depression and twenty-third named storm of the record-breaking 2020 Atlantic hurricane season, Beta originally formed from a trough of low pressure that developed in the northeastern Gulf of Mexico on September 10. The low moved slowly southwestward, with development hampered initially by the development of nearby Hurricane Sally. After Sally moved inland over the Southeastern United States and weakened, the disturbance became nearly stationary in the southwestern Gulf, where it began to organize. By September 16, the storm had gained a low-level circulation center and had enough organization to be designated as Tropical Depression Twenty-Two. (Note: Beta's precursor depression was operationally classified as the season's twenty-second depression. In the post-season analysis, it was discovered that Subtropical Storm Alpha had developed six hours before it.) The system held its intensity for a day due to the influence of strong wind shear and dry air, before eventually attaining tropical storm strength. It slowly moved northward and intensified to a mid-range tropical storm before dry air and wind shear halted its intensification. Beta then became nearly stationary on September 19, before starting to move west towards the Texas coast the next day, weakening as it approached. On September 21, Beta made landfall near Matagorda Peninsula, Texas as a minimal tropical storm. It subsequently weakened to a tropical depression the next day before becoming post-tropical early on September 23. Its remnants moved northeastward, before the center elongated and merged with a cold front early on September 25.

The storm's sprawling nature and slow-movement caused numerous areas along the Gulf Coast to be pounded by heavy surf and high waves for several days, while torrential rainfall and storm surge affected areas that were already struggling to recover from previous tropical cyclones, such as Hurricanes Laura and Sally. Several streets, highways, and even interstates in Houston were closed due to flooding. Louisiana, Mississippi, Alabama, Georgia, the Carolinas were all impacted by flooding, gusty winds, and severe weather as well. One fatality in Texas due to Beta's impacts has been confirmed. Total damage from the storm was estimated to be at least $225 million.

== Meteorological history ==
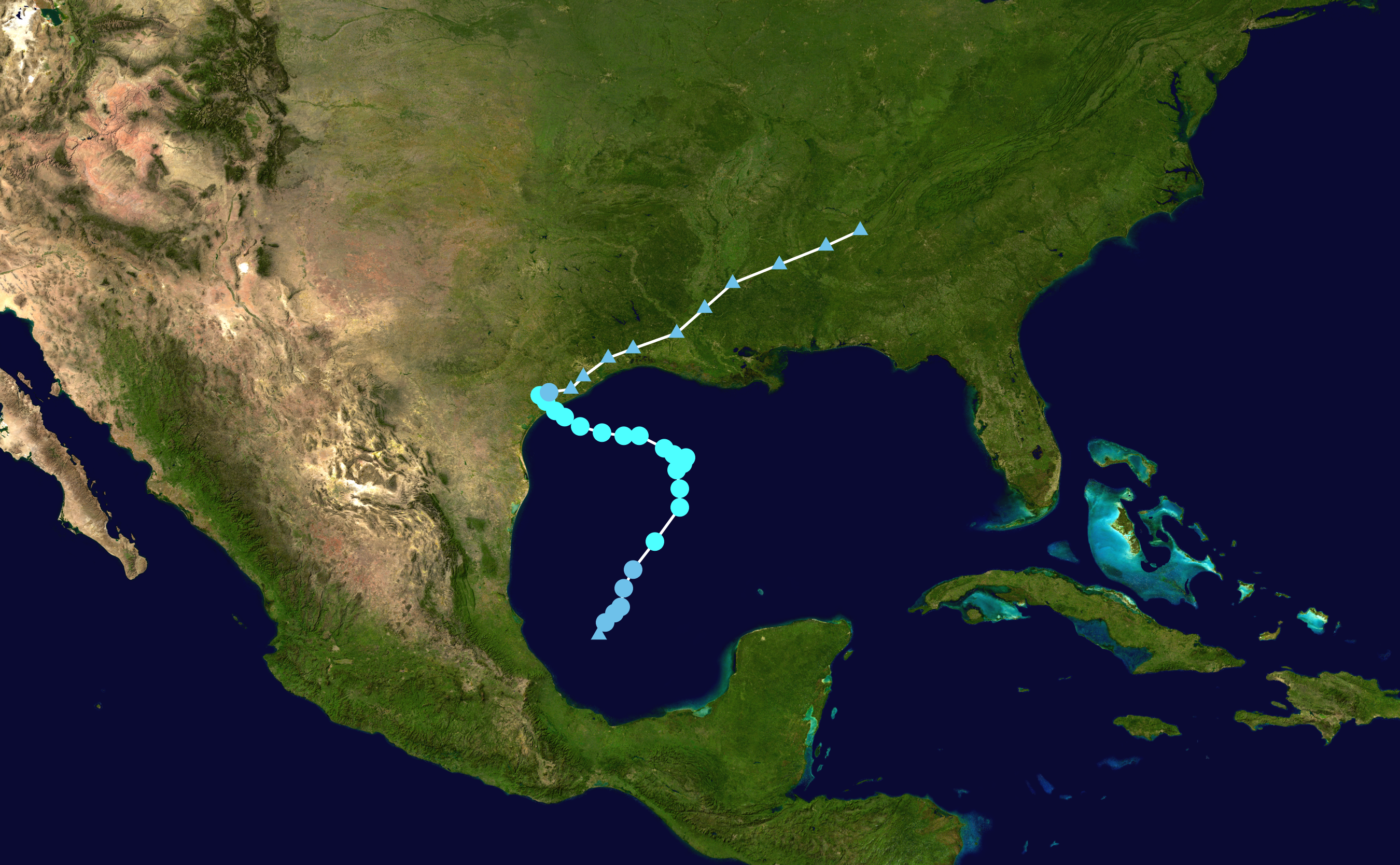
Map plotting the storm's track and intensity, according to the Saffir–Simpson scale Map key Saffir–Simpson scale Tropical depression (≤38 mph, ≤62 km/h) Tropical storm (39–73 mph, 63–118 km/h) Category 1 (74–95 mph, 119–153 km/h) Category 2 (96–110 mph, 154–177 km/h) Category 3 (111–129 mph, 178–208 km/h) Category 4 (130–156 mph, 209–251 km/h) Category 5 (≥157 mph, ≥252 km/h) Unknown Storm type Tropical cyclone Subtropical cyclone Extratropical cyclone, remnant low, tropical disturbance, or monsoon depression

The National Hurricane Center (NHC) began to monitor a trough at 12:00 UTC on September 10. Little to no development of the system occurred as it began to slowly turn southwestward and by September 14, it was not expected to become a tropical cyclone due to strong upper-level winds produced by nearby Hurricane Sally. Nonetheless, the disturbance persisted and moved southwestward into the southwestern Gulf of Mexico where it began to organize as Sally moved away into the Southeastern United States early on September 16. The next day, hurricane hunters found a closed circulation, and as thunderstorms persisted near the center, the NHC initiated advisories on Tropical Depression Twenty-Two at 23:00 UTC on September 17. However, post-season analysis revealed that the system had developed into a tropical depression several hours earlier, at 12:00 UTC that day. At 21:00 UTC on September 18, the system strengthened into Tropical Storm Beta, becoming the earliest forming 23rd tropical or subtropical storm on record in an Atlantic hurricane season, surpassing the old mark of October 22, established by Tropical Storm Alpha of 2005.

Although affected by wind shear and dry air, the storm continued to intensify, reaching a peak intensity of 60 mph (97 km/h) and a pressure of 994 mb (29.36 inHg) at 15:00 UTC on September 19. However, it became nearly stationary after turning westward over the Gulf of Mexico. This caused upwelling and the continued negative effects of dry air and wind shear caused the storm to become disorganized, although its wind speeds remained the same thanks to an outflow boundary. After jogging northeastward, Beta's convection continued to wax and wane as the storm moved west-northwest with the center reforming to the west. Beta's structure further degraded as stable cold-air stratocumulus clouds wrapped around its center. As Beta approached the Texas coast, it weakened some before making landfall on the Matagorda Peninsula at 04:00 UTC on September 22 with winds of 45 mph (72 km/h) and a pressure of 999 mbar (29.5 inHg). Afterwards, Beta weakened some more, falling to tropical depression status at 15:00 UTC. It then became nearly stationary again before turning east and weakening some more, causing the NHC to issue their final advisory and giving future advisory responsibilities to the Weather Prediction Center (WPC). Beta then became a post-tropical cyclone at 03:00 UTC on September 23 and accelerated northeastward, passing through Louisiana and Mississippi into Northern Alabama. The center became less defined and the heavy rainfall threat diminished, and the system dissipated at 06:00 UTC on September 25. Subsequently, the WPC issued their final advisory at 09:00 UTC that day.

== Preparations and impact ==
Tropical storm, hurricane, and storm surge watches were issued along a large portion of the coastline from the Texas-Mexico border to south central Louisiana in advance of the storm. The hurricane watches were later dropped when the storm failed to strengthen past 60 mph, but most of the other watches were upgraded to warnings. Several voluntary evacuations were issued by city and county governments over concerns of particularly vulnerable areas around Houston and Galveston. Flood warnings and watches of various types were issued throughout Texas and Louisiana as the storm approached coastal Texas and then made landfall. As the storm moved inland into Louisiana, a tornado watch was issued for the southern and eastern part of the state as well as Southern Mississippi.

Radar mosaic of Tropical Storm Beta making landfall and weakening over the southern United States from September 19 to 23.

On September 18, prior to the system being upgraded into a tropical storm, a Hurricane Hunter mission which started at Keesler Air Force Base in Mississippi was aborted when lightning from the system struck the Lockheed WC-130J Hercules sent to gather data causing the plane's radar systems to go down, endangering the occupants of the flight.

A tornado warning was issued for Galveston County, Texas on the afternoon of September 21, although no tornadoes were confirmed. A number of flash flood warnings were also issued as rainbands began to continually move over the same areas. On September 23, favorable atmospheric conditions led to a flurry of tornado, severe thunderstorm and special marine warnings as the remnants of the storm moved through Louisiana and into Mississippi, but again no tornadoes were confirmed.

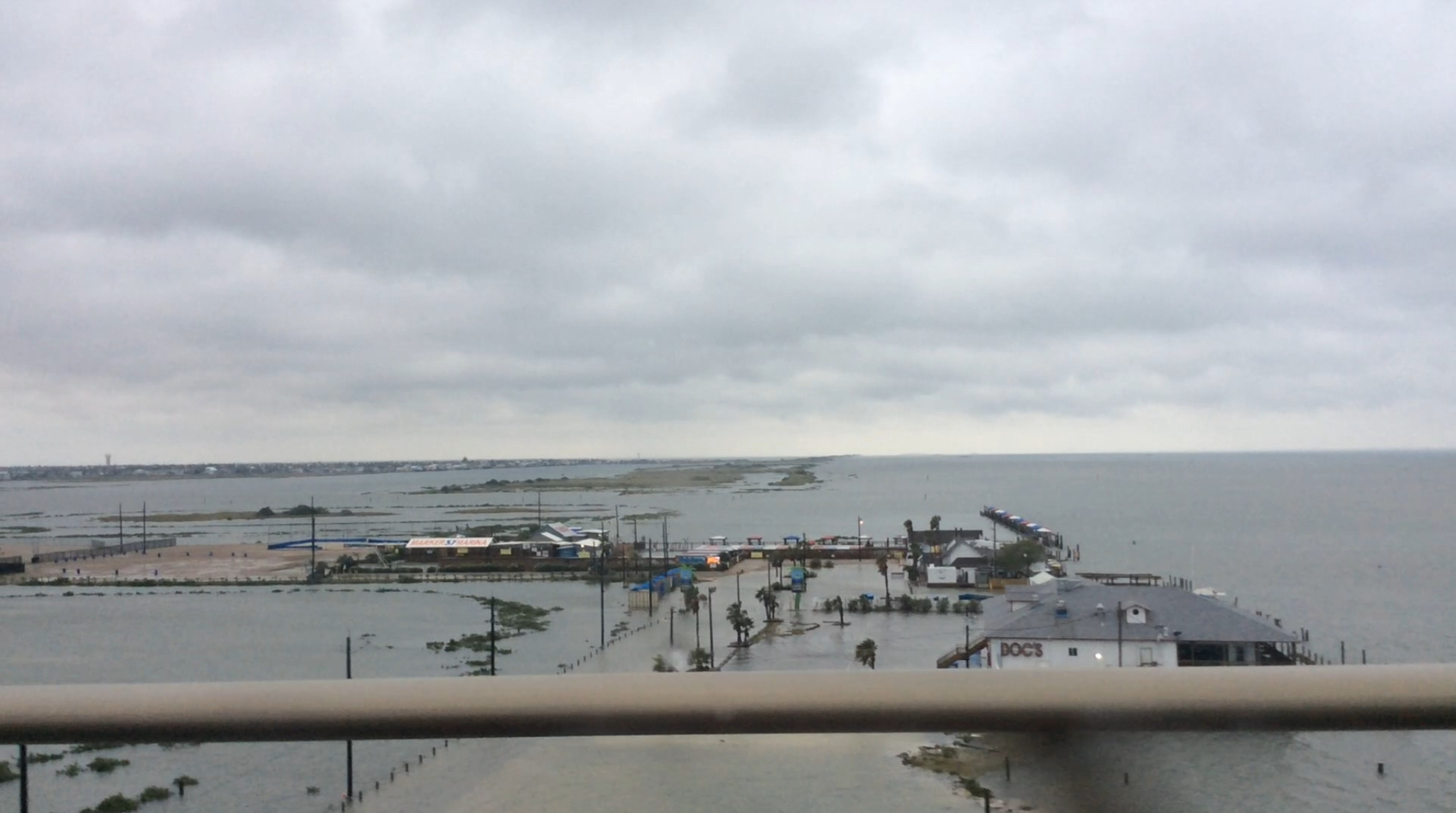
Coastal flooding from Beta in Corpus Christi, Texas as viewed from the John F. Kennedy Memorial Causeway.

Heavy surf and high waves from Beta destroyed part of a pier in Galveston, Texas while storm surge flooding left many areas of the Texas coast under water. Around the time of landfall, a wind gust of 48 mph (77 km/h) was recorded in Port Lavaca. Parts of I-69 and TX 288 were closed by flooding and high water rescue teams responded to dozens of calls for help. By the time Beta had weakened to a tropical depression on September 22, over 100 high-water rescues had taken place in Houston as portions of the city became heavily inundated by the storm's high rainfall totals, exceeding 9 in (23 cm) in parts of the city. Dozens of streets and highways in the city, including parts of I-69, I-45, and TX 288 and 290, were closed by fast-rising water. Officials urged residents to stay home and avoid driving if possible. The sprawling nature of the storm also brought heavy rainfall to Louisiana, which was still recovering from a number of other systems that had affected the state during the season. Texas Governor Greg Abbott issued disaster declarations for 29 counties, while Louisiana Governor John Bel Edwards declared a state of emergency. A missing fisherman who had gone into Brays Bayou during the storm was later discovered drowned. Heavy rainfall, flooding, and gusty winds also impacted Mississippi, Tennessee, Arkansas, Alabama, and Georgia. The remnants of the storm fueled a small severe weather event across the Carolinas on September 25 with severe thunderstorms producing wind damage and unusually significant hail up to 2.25 inches (5.7 cm) in diameter. An EF0 tornado was also confirmed in Myrtle Beach, South Carolina as well, although it was not directly associated with the storm.

== Naming ==
The 2020 season was the second (along with 2005) in which an alphabetic list of 21 storm names had been exhausted, necessitating use of the Greek alphabet auxiliary list. In March 2021, the World Meteorological Organization replaced that auxiliary list with a new 21-name supplemental list. As a result, the letter Beta will not be used to name another Atlantic hurricane.

== See also ==
- Tropical cyclones in 2020
- Other storms named Beta
- Tropical Storm Frances (1998) – Storm that followed a similar track.
- Tropical Storm Allison (2001) – Also caused flash flooding in the Houston area before moving through the Southeast
- Hurricane Claudette (2003) – Category 1 hurricane that struck Texas.
- Tropical Storm Bill (2015) – Storm that followed a nearly identical track
- Hurricane Harvey (2017) – A Category 4 hurricane that also caused catastrophic flooding in the same region when it stalled as a tropical storm.
- Tropical Storm Imelda (2019) – Weak tropical cyclone which caused similar extreme flooding in the same region
- Hurricane Nicholas (2021) - Minimal category 1 hurricane that took a similar track before making landfall in Texas
