= Betty =

Betty or Bettie is a feminine given name. It is commonly a diminutive for the names Bethany and Elizabeth. In Latin America, it is also a common diminutive for the given name Beatriz, the Spanish and Portuguese form of the Latin name Beatrix and the English name Beatrice. In the 17th and 18th centuries, it was more often a diminutive of Bethia.

== People ==
=== Athletes ===
- Betty Batt (1916–2003), British tennis player
- Betty Bays (1931–1992), American baseball player
- Betty Belton (1916–1989), English cricketer
- Betty Birch (1923–2016), English cricketer
- Betty Bonifay, American water skier
- Betty Boucher (born 1943), American retired professional wrestler
- Betty Bourquin, Swiss female curler and coach
- Betty Brey (1931–2015), American swimmer
- Betty Brosmer (born 1929), American former bodybuilder and physical fitness expert
- Betty Brussel (born 1924), Canadian swimmer
- Betty Burfeindt (born 1945), American golfer
- Betty Burua (born 1986), Papua New Guinean track athlete
- Betty Callaway (1928–2011), English figure skating coach
- Betty Carnegy-Arbuthnott (1906–1985), British fencer
- Betty Carveth (1925–2019), Canadian baseball player
- Betty Chepkemoi (born 2000), Kenyan long-distance runner
- Betty Chepkwony (born 1995), Kenyan long-distance runner
- Betty Constable (1924–2008), American squash player
- Betty Jane Cornett (1932–2006), infielder and pitcher
- Betty Couper, British tennis player
- Betty Cuthbert (1938–2017), Australian sprinter and Olympic champion
- Betty Degner, American baseball player
- Betty Dodd (1931–1993), American professional golfer
- Betty Duguid (1932–2017), Canadian-American curler
- Betty Forbes (1916–2002), New Zealand high jumper
- Betty Forsyth (1945–2021), Scottish bowls player
- Betty Foss (1929–1998), American baseball player
- Betty Foulk, American sailor
- Betty Francis (1931–2016), American baseball outfielder
- Betty Jane Fritz (1924–1994), baseball player
- Betty Jo Geiger (born 1961), American long-distance runner
- Betty Glassey, Papua New Guinean international lawn bowler
- Betty Gowans, Canadian canoeist
- Betty Gray (1920–2018), Welsh table tennis player
- Betty Evans Grayson (1925–July 9, 1979), American softball pitcher
- Betty Grimes (1899–1976), American diver
- Betty Sue Hagerman, American tennis coach
- Betty Haig (1905–1987), British racing driver
- Betty Jo Hawkins (1930–1987), American professional wrestler
- Betty Heidler (born 1983), German hammer thrower
- Betty Henry (1922–1944), American table tennis player
- Betty Herbertson, Australian lawn bowler
- Betty Heukels (born 1942), Dutch swimmer
- Betty Hicks (1920–2011), American professional golfer
- Betty Hilton (1920–2017), British tennis player
- Betty Holstein, Australian tennis player
- Betty Jameson (1919–2009), American Hall-of-Fame golfer and one of the founders of the LPGA
- Betty Jaynes (1945–2014), American basketball coach
- Betty Jouanny (born 1992), French ice hockey player
- Betty Judge (1921–2015), Australian athletics coach
- Betty Ann Kennedy (1930–2016), American bridge player
- Betty Kernot (1910–1984), Australian golfer
- Betty Kizza (born 1996), Ugandan netball player
- Betty Kozai (1928–2021), American curler
- Betty Kretschmer (born 1928), Chilean sprinter
- Betty Law (1928–2001), Scottish curler
- Betty Lempus (born 1991), Kenyan long-distance runner
- Betty Lennox (born 1976), American basketball player
- Betty Lindberg (born 1924), American track and field athlete
- Betty Lise (born 1972), French triple jumper
- Betty Lock (1921–1986), British athlete
- Betty Lombard (1920–1984), Irish tennis player
- Betty Luna (1927–2004), baseball player
- Betty Maker (1925–2004), New Zealand cricketer
- Betty McCracken, Canadian curler
- Betty McDonald (born 1950), Australian cricketer
- Betty McKenna (1931–1992), American baseball player
- Betty McKilligan (born 1949), Canadian pairs figure skater
- Betty McKinnon (1925–1981), Australian sprinter
- Betty McNamara, New Zealand netball player
- Betty Moczynski (1926–2017), American baseball player
- Betty Molteni (born 1962), Italian middle-distance runner
- Betty Moore (diver) (born 1929), New Zealand diver
- Betty R. Moore (born 1934), Australian athlete
- Betty Morgan (born 1942), Welsh international lawn and indoor bowler
- Betty Morris (born 1948), American bowler
- Betty Niccoli (born 1943), American professional wrestler
- Betty Ann Bjerkreim Nilsen (born 1986), Norwegian orienteer
- Betty Noël (born 1988), French-born Luxembourgish footballer
- Betty Nuthall (1911–1983), English tennis player
- Betty Okino (born 1975), American gymnast
- Betty Olssen, Fijian international lawn bowler
- Betty Pariso (born 1956), American bodybuilder
- Betty Petryna (1930–2020), American baseball player
- Betty Plant (1920–2002), New Zealand netball player
- Betty Rosenquest Pratt (1925–2016), American tennis player
- Betty Robinson (1911–1999), American athletics competitor
- Betty Russell (1924–1985), American baseball player
- Betty Rusynyk (1924–2013), American baseball player
- Betty Sain (born 1942), US horse trainer and breeder
- Betty Shellenberger (1921–2019), American field hockey player
- Betty Sinclair (1933–2009), New Zealand cricketer
- Betty Slade (1921–2000), British diver
- Betty Snowball (1908–1988), English cricketer and sportsperson
- Betty Stanhope-Cole (1937–2017), Canadian golfer
- Betty Steffensen (born 1936), New Zealand netball player
- Betty Stöve (born 1945), Dutch tennis player
- Betty Ann Grubb Stuart (born 1950), American tennis player
- Betty Stubbings, English bowls player
- Betty Sugrue, Irish camogie player
- Betty Sworowski (born 1961), British race-walker
- Betty Tancock (1911–2009), Canadian swimmer
- Betty Taylor (1916–1977), Canadian hurdle racer
- Betty Thorner (born 1938), New Zealand cricketer
- Betty Trezza (1925–2007), American baseball player
- Betty Tucker (1924–2012), American baseball player
- Betty Uber (1906–1983), English badminton and tennis player
- Betty Viana-Adkins (born 1971), Venezuelan bodybuilder
- Betty Wagoner (1930–2006), American baseball player
- Betty Wanless (1928–1995), baseball player
- Betty Warfel (1928–1990), baseball player
- Betty Weir (1924–2020), American alpine skier
- Betty Whiting (1925–1967), baseball player
- Betty Wilson (1921–2010), Australian cricketer
- Betty Yahr (1923–2010), American baseball player

=== Journalists and media personalities ===
- Betty Bayé (born 1946), American journalist, columnist and editor
- Betty Bowen, American journalist
- Betty Ann Bowser (1944–2018), American journalist
- Betty Ann Bruno (1931–2023), American reporter and journalist
- Bettie Cadou (1936–c. 2002), American journalist
- Betty Werlein Carter (1910–2000), American publisher, editor and writer
- Betty Caywood (1946–2020), American sportscaster
- Betty Elizalde (1940–2018), Argentine journalist and broadcaster
- Betty Go-Belmonte (1933–1994), Filipina journalist and newspaper publisher
- Betty Irabor (born 1957), Nigerian columnist, philanthropist, writer, publisher and founder of Genevieve Magazine
- Betty Kenward (1906–2001), American magazine columnist
- Betty Kyallo (born 1989), Kenyan news anchor and journalist
- Betty J. Ligon (1921–2015), American journalist
- Betty Liu (born 1973), Hong Kong journalist
- Betty Mendez Livioco (1931–2006), radio host
- Betty Mandeville (1910 or 1911–2001), American radio director and one of the first female producer
- Bettie Johnson Mbayo, Liberian journalist
- Betty Medsger, American journalist
- Betty Nguyen (born 1974), American news anchor
- Betty Olive Osborn (1934–2020), Australian journalist
- Betty Pino (1948–2013), Ecuadorian radio personality
- Betty A. Prashker (died 2024), American editor
- Betty Rollin (1936–2023), American journalist and author
- Betty Wason (1912–2001), American writer and broadcast journalist
- Betty Willingale (1927–2021), British television producer and script editor

=== Performing artists and fashion models ===
- Betty Aberlin (born 1942), American actress
- Betty Alberge (1922–1991), British actress
- Betty Alden (1891–1948), American actress
- Betty Allen (1927–2009), American singer
- Betty Amann (1905–1990), German-American actress
- Betty Amos (1934–2021), American musician
- Betty Arlen (1909–1966), American actress
- Betty Arvaniti (born 1939), Greek actress
- Betty Astell (1912–2005), English actress
- Betty Astor (1905–c. 1972), German actress
- Betty Balfour (1902–1977), British actress
- Betty Banafe (born 1979), Malaysian actress and singer
- Betty Bartley (1922–2013), American actress
- Betty Baskcomb (1914–2003), British actress
- Betty Beath (born 1932), Australian composer
- Betty Beckers (1925–1982), French actress
- Betty Humby Beecham (1908–1958), British pianist
- Betty Bennett (1921–2020), American jazz singer
- Betty Bird (1901–1998), Austrian actress
- Betty Blue (1931–2000), American model and actress
- Betty Blythe (1893–1972), American actress
- Betty Bobbitt (1939–2020), Australian actress
- Betty Boije (1822–1854), Finnish-Swedish contralto and composer
- Betty Bolton (1906–2005), British actress
- Betty Boniphace, Tanzanian model
- Betty Boo (born 1970), stage name of English singer and songwriter Alison Moira Clarkson
- Betty Bouton (1891–1965), American actress
- Betty Box (1915–1999), British film producer
- Betty Boyd (1908–1971), American actress
- Betty Brewer (1924–2006), American actress
- Betty Brice (1888–1935), American actress
- Betty Brodel (1920–2024), American actress
- Betty Bronson (1906–1971), American actress
- Betty Browne (1900–1959), American screenwriter and stage actress
- Betty Bryant (1920–2005), Australian actress
- Betty Bryson (1911–1984), American film actress and dancer
- Betty Buckley (born 1947), American actress
- Betty Buehler (1921–2012), American actress
- Betty Burbridge (1895–1987), American actress
- Betty Burgess (1917–2003), American actress
- Betty Burstall (1926–2013), Australian theatre director
- Betty Callish (1886–after 1941), Dutch-born actress, singer, and violinist
- Betty Cantor-Jackson (born 1948), American audio engineer and producer
- Betty Ann Carr (1942–1995), American actress
- Betty Carter (Lillie Mae Jones) (1929–1998), American jazz singer
- Betty Chung, Hong Kong singer
- Betty Ross Clarke (1892–1970), American actress
- Betty Clooney (1931–1976), American singer
- Betty Cody (1921–2014), Canadian-born American country music singer
- Betty Compson (1897–1974), American actress
- Betty Compton (1906–1944), American actress
- Betty Corday (1912–1987), American actress and television producer
- Betty Cordon (1923–2012), American socialite
- Betty Corwin (1920–2019), American theater archivist
- Betty Curtis (1936–2006), Italian singer
- Betty Daussmond (1873–1957), French actress
- Betty David (c. 1938–2007), Native American fashion designer
- Betty Ann Davies (1910–1955), British actress
- Bette Davis (1908–1989) American actress
- Betty Davis (1944–2022), American singer, songwriter, and model
- Bettie de Jong (born 1933), Dutch rehearsal director and dancer
- Betty Deland (1831–1882), Swedish actress
- Betty Driver (1920–2011), British actress and singer
- Betty Cole Dukert (1927–2024), American television producer
- Betty Everett (1939–2001), American soul singer
- Betty Fabila (born 1929), Mexican opera singer
- Betty Faire (1897–1981), British actress
- Betty Faria (born 1941), Brazilian actress
- Betty Farrington (1898–1989), American actress
- Betty Felsen (1905–2000), ballet dancer, vaudeville star, and teacher
- Betty Ferns (born 1946), Indian actress and singer
- Betty Fibichová (1846–1901), Czech opera singer
- Betty Field (1913–1973), American actress
- Betty Fields (1906–1938), British actress
- Bettie Mae Fikes, American singer
- Bettie Fisher, Australian Aboriginal musician and theatre administrator
- Betty Francisco (1900–1950), American actress
- Betty Kathungu Furet, Kenyan director and film producer
- Betty G, a stage name of an Ethiopian singer and songwriter Bruktawit Getahun
- Betty Gabriel (born 1981), American actress
- Betty Garde (1905–1989), American actress
- Betty Garrett (1919–2011), American actress, comedian, singer and dancer
- Betty George (1926–2007), American singer
- Betty Lou Gerson (1914–1999), American actress
- Betty Gilpin (born 1986), American actress
- Betty Glamann (1923–1990), American jazz musician
- Betty Gofman (born 1965), Brazilian actress
- Betty Grable (1916–1973), American actress, singer, dancer and pin-up girl
- Betty Ann Grove (1929–2015), American actress
- Betty Haag, American music educator
- Betty Halbreich (1927–2024), American personal shopper, stylist and author
- Betty Hall, early 20th century child film actress
- Betty Harford (born 1927), American actress
- Betty Harlafti, Greek mezzo-soprano and singer
- Betty Harris (born 1939), American soul singer
- Betty Harte (1882–1965), American actress
- Betty Helsengreen (1914–1956), Danish actress
- Betty Henderson (1907–1979), Scottish actress
- Betty Hennings (1850–1939), Danish actress
- Betty Lou Holland (1925–2021), American actress
- Betty Howe (1895–1969), American actress
- Betty Huntley-Wright (1911–1993), British actress and vocalist
- Betty Hutton (1921–2007), American actress and singer
- Betty Jackson (born 1949), English fashion designer
- Betty Jardine (1903–1945), English actress
- Betty Jaynes (1921–2018), American actress
- Betty Jewel (1899–1963), American actress
- Betty Joel (1894–1985), British furniture, textile and interior designer
- Betty Johnson (1929–2022), American pop and cabaret singer
- Betty Hall Jones (1911–2009), American jazz musician
- Betty Jones (1930–2019), American soprano
- Betty Jumel (1901–1990), British actress
- Betty Kaplan (born 1949), American film director
- Betty Kean (1914–1986), American actress
- Betty Lou Keim (1938–2010), American actress
- Betty Kelly (born 1944), American singer, member of Martha and the Vandellas
- Betty Jackson King (1928–1994), American composer, pianist and educator
- Betty Knox (Alice Elizabeth Peden) (1906–1963), part of Wilson, Keppel and Betty, a British music hall and vaudeville act
- Betty Kuuskemaa (1879–1966), Estonian actress
- Betty Lago (1955–2015), Brazilian actress
- Betty Laine, English dance teacher and former professional dancer
- Betty LaVette (born 1946), American soul singer
- Betty Lawford (1912–1960), English film and stage actress
- Betty Leggett (1857–1931), American socialite
- Betty Liste, American jazz pianist
- Betty Loh Ti (1937–1968), Chinese actress
- Betty Low (1916–2016), Canadian ballet dancer and actress
- Betty Lucas (1924–2015), Australian character actress and theatre director
- Betty Luster (1922–2011), American actress
- Betty Lynn (1926–2021), American actress
- Betty Lynne (1911–2011), British actress
- Betty Mack (1901–1980), American actress
- Betty Madigan (born 1928), American actress
- Betty Mars (1944–1989), French actress and singer
- Betty Marsden (1919–1998), British actor and comedian
- Betty Maxwell (born 1994), American beauty pageant titleholder
- Betty May, British model
- Betty May (actress) (1904–1949), American actress
- Betty McDowall (1924–1993), Australian actress
- Betty McGlown (1941–2008), American singer
- Betty McQuade (1941–2011), American rock and roll and pop singer
- Betty Meredith-Jones (1908–1996), Welsh dance educator
- Betty Miles (1910–1992), American actress
- Betty Missiego (born 1938), Spanish singer
- Betty Mitchell (1896–1976), Canadian theatre director
- Betty Monroe (born 1978), Mexican actress
- Betty Moon, Canadian-American singer
- Betty Morgan, American vocalist and recording artist
- Betty Morrissey (1907–1944), American film actress
- Betty Moschona (1927–2006), Greek actress
- Betty Nakibuuka, Ugandan gospel musician
- Betty Nansen (1873–1943), Danish actress
- Betty Naz (born 1945), Indian actress and singer
- Betty Noyes (1912–1987), American actress
- Betty Oberacker, American pianist
- Betty Oliphant (1918–2004), American dance educator
- Betty Olivero (born 1954), Israeli composer and music educator
- Bettie Page (1923–2008), American pin-up and fetish model
- Betty Paul (1921–2011), British actress and screenwriter
- Betty Pei Ti (born 1951), Taiwanese actress
- Betty Jane Rhodes (1921–2011), American actress
- Betty Robbins (1924–2004), American singer
- Betty Jean Robinson (1933–2021), American Christian music singer-songwriter
- Betty Roché (1918–1999), American blues singer
- Betty Roe (born 1930), English composer, singer, vocal coach and conductor
- Betty Rothenberg, American television and theatre director
- Betty Rowland (1916–2022), American actress and dancer
- Betty Schade (1895–1982), American actress
- Betty Schuurman, Dutch actress
- Betty Smidth (1819–1892), Danish stage actress and opera soprano
- Betty Ruth Smith (1915–2008), American actress
- Betty Smith (1929–2011), English jazz saxophonist and singer
- Betty Steinberg (1910–1965), American film editor
- Betty Stockfeld (1905–1966), Australian actress
- Betty Taoutel, Lebanese actress
- Betty Loo Taylor (1929–2016), American jazz musician
- Betty Taylor (1919–2011), American actress and performer
- Betty Thatcher (1944–2011), English lyricist
- Betty Thomas (born 1947), American director and actress
- Betty Thompson (1934–1994), Canadian television personality
- Betty Ting (born 1947), Taiwanese actress
- Betty Treadville (1911–1989), American singer and actress
- Betty Veizaga (born 1957), Bolivian folk music musician
- Betty Vio (1806–1872), German opera singer
- Betty Walker (1928–1982), Jewish-American actress and comedian
- Betty Wand (1923–2003), American singer
- B. J. Ward (born 1944), American actress
- Betty Warren (1905–1990), English actress
- Betty Jane Watson (1921–2016), American actress and singer
- Betty White (1922–2021), American actress, best known for Life with Elizabeth, The Mary Tyler Moore Show and The Golden Girls
- Betty Who (born 1991), Australian-American singer and musician
- Betty Willingale (1927–2021), British television producer
- Betty Willis (1941–2018), American soul singer
- Betty Winkler (1914–2002), American actress
- Betty Rose Wishart, American composer and pianist
- Betty Ann Wong (born 1938), American author, composer and multi-media musician
- Betty Wragge (1918–2002), American actress
- Betty Wright (1953–2020), American soul and R&B singer and songwriter
- Betty Yokova (c. 1901–1995), Czech-born French-American fashion designer
- Betty Zhou (born 1981), Chinese actress and singer
- Betty (singer) (born 2003), Armenian child singer

=== Politicians and activists ===
- Betty Abbott (1923–2005), American politician
- Betty Adkins (1934–2001), American politician
- Betty Amongi (born 1975), Ugandan politician
- Betty Harvie Anderson (1913–1979), British Conservative Party politician
- Betty Andujar (1912–1997), American politician
- Betty Anyanwu-Akeredolu (born 1953), Nigerian activist and fishery expert and the first lady of Ondo State in Nigeria
- Betty Apiafi (born 1962), Nigerian MP and educator
- Betty Babcock (1922–2013), American politician
- Betty Ballinger (1854–1936), American suffragist
- Betty Baxter, Canadian politician
- Betty Oyella Bigombe (born 1952), Ugandan politician
- Betty de Boer (born 1971), Dutch politician
- Betty Bolognani (1926–2016), American politician
- Betty Boothroyd (1929–2023), British MP and former Speaker of the House of Commons
- Betty Boyd (Oklahoma legislator) (1924–2011), American politician
- Betty Boyd (Colorado legislator) (born 1943), American state legislator
- Betty Brown (born 1939), American politician
- Betty Bumpers (1925–2018), American activist
- Betty Campbell (1934–2017), Welsh community activist
- Betty Cardenas, American political activist
- Betty Castor (born 1941), American politician
- Betty Jo Charlton (1923–2014), American politician
- Betty Louke Chelain, Ugandan politician
- Betty Chew (born 1964), Malaysian politician
- Betty Christian (born 1943), Pitcairn Island politician
- Betty Croquer, Venezuelan politician
- Betty Currie (born 1939), American government official
- Betty De Boef (born 1951), American politician
- Betty de Boer (born 1971), Dutch politician
- Betty DeGeneres (born 1930), American activist
- Betty Denton (born 1943), American politician
- Betty Diale, South African politician
- Betty Jane Diener (1940–2015), American politician
- Betty Disero, Canadian politician
- Betty Ann Dittemore (1919–2000), Colorado politician
- Bettie du Toit (1910–2002), South African trade unionist and anti apartheid activist
- Betty Dubiner (1912–2008), Canadian-born Israeli activist
- Betty Edmondson (1924–1998), American politician
- Betty Awori Engola (born 1960), Ugandan politician
- Betty Fiorina (1919–2010), American politician
- Betty Friedan (1921–2006), American feminist and author of The Feminine Mystique
- Betty Gay, American politician
- Betty Glad (1927–2010), American political scientist
- Betty Jean Grant (born 1948), American politician
- Betty Grundberg (1938–2022), American politician
- Betty Hall (1921–2018), American politician, former member of the New Hampshire House of Representatives
- Betty Hanson (1918–2008), Manx politician
- Betty Cooper Hearnes (1927–2023), American politician
- Betty Heathfield (1927–2006), English labour activist
- Betty Heitman (1929–1994), American Republican politician
- Bettie Hewes (1924–2001), Canadian politician
- Betty Hill (activist) (1876–1960), American activist
- Betty Hill (politician) (1937–2013), Canadian politician
- Betty Hinton (born 1950), Canadian politician
- Betty Hocking (1928–2017), Australian politician
- Betty Holzendorf (1940–2024), American politician
- Betty J. Hoxsey (1923–2011), American politician
- Betty de Courcy Ireland (1911–1999), Irish socialist and anti-war activist
- Betty Ireland (born 1946), American politician
- Betty Ann Kane, American politician
- Betty Karnette (1931–2021), American politician
- Betty Ann Keegan (1920–1974), American politician
- Betty Kegakilwe, South African politician
- Betty Kennedy (1926–2017), Canadian politician
- Betty Kiernan (born 1955), Australian politician
- Betty E. King, American diplomat
- Betty Komp (born 1949), American politician, former member of the Oregon House of Representatives
- Betty Little (born 1940), American politician
- Betty Lockwood, Baroness Lockwood (1924–2019), British political activist
- Betty Jane Long (1928–2023), American politician
- Betty Maina, Kenyan politician
- Betty Makoni (born 1971), Zimbabwean women's rights activist
- Betty Malmberg (born 1958), Swedish politician
- Betty Ray McCain (1931–2022), American politician
- Betty McCollum (born 1954), American politician, member of the U.S. House of Representatives
- Betty Krosbi Mensah (born 1980), Ghanaian politician
- Betty Metcalf (1921–2017), American clinical psychologist and former politician
- Betty Millard (1911–2010), American writer, artist, political activist, philanthropist, feminist
- Betty Montgomery (born 1948), American politician
- Betty Morrison, American state legislator
- Betty Mould-Iddrisu (born 1953), Ghanaian lawyer and politician
- Betty Muzanira (born 1968), Ugandan politician
- Betty Ethel Naluyima, Ugandan politician
- Betty Nambooze (born 1969), Ugandan politician
- Betty Jo Nelsen (1935–2024), American politician
- Betty Nippi-Albright, Canadian politician
- Betty Aol Ochan (born 1958), Ugandan politician
- Betty Ogwaro, South Sudanese politician
- Betty Olson (born 1946), American politician
- Betty Olsson, Swedish suffragist and peace activist
- Betty Overbey (born 1946), American politician
- Betty Palaso, Papua New Guinean diplomat
- Betty Papworth (1914–2008), British communist and anti-war activist
- Betty Parsley, Canadian politician
- Betty Pickett, American politician, former member of the Arkansas House of Representatives
- Betty Price, American politician
- Betty Reed (1941–2022), American politician
- Betty Santoro (1938–2005), American activist
- Bettie Cook Scott (born 1953), American politician
- Betty Shabazz (1934–1997), American educator and civil rights advocate, wife of Malcolm X
- Betty Kronman Shapiro (1907–1989), American Jewish activist
- Bettie Shumway (1924–2007), American politician
- Betty Sims (1935–2016), American politician
- Betty Sinclair (1910–1981), Northern Irish communist organizer
- Betty Soukup (born 1947), American politician
- Betty Sutton (born 1963), American politician
- Betty Swenson (1933–2016), American politician
- Betty Gram Swing (1893–1969), American militant suffragist
- Betty Talmadge (1923–2005), American civic leader, author, socialite, landowner, and businesswoman
- Betty Taylor (community advocate), Australian community advocate and domestic violence prevention campaigner
- Betty Tebbs (1918–2017), English activist
- Betty Tejada (born 1959), Bolivian ecologist, lawyer and politician
- Betty L. Thompson (1939–2021), American politician
- Betty Tianti, American trade union leader
- Betty Tola (born 1965), Ecuadorian politician
- Betty Unger (born 1943), Canadian politician
- Betty Villegas, American politician
- Betty Kirk West, American state legislator
- Betty Williams (Nobel laureate) (1943–2020), North Irish peace activist
- Betty Williams (politician) (born 1944), Welsh politician and MP
- Betty Wilson (born 1932), American politician
- Betty Workman (1924–2018), American politician
- Betty Yee (born 1957), American politician

=== Scientists and technologists ===
- Betty Allan (1905–1952), Australian statistician
- Betty Molesworth Allen (1913–2002), New Zealand botanist
- Betty Lise Anderson, American electrical engineer
- Betty Lou Bailey (1929–2007), American mechanical engineer
- Betty Q. Banker (1921–2010), pediatric neuropathologist
- Betty Bernardelli (1919–1998), psychologist
- Betty Blake (1931–1982), American historic preservationist and promoter
- Betty Baume Clark, British archaeologist, illustrator and museum curator
- Betty Clements (1918–1965), American physician
- Betty Collette (1930–2017), veterinary pathologist
- Betty Cronin (1928–2016), American bacteriologist
- Betty Diamond (born 1948), American physician and researcher
- Betty Eisner (1915–2004), American psychologist
- Betty Flehinger (c. 1922–2000), biostatistician
- Betty Flint (1909–2011), New Zealand scientist
- Betty Fox (1937–2011), Canadian cancer researcher
- Betty Gikonyo (born 1950), Kenyan medical entrepreneur and pediatric cardiologist
- Betty Harris (born 1940), American explosives scientist
- Betty Hay (1927–2007), American cell and developmental biologist
- Betty Holberton (1917–2001), American computer scientist
- Betty W. Holz (1919–2005), American mathematician
- Betty Kobayashi Issenman (1921–2020), Canadian ethnologist
- Betty Johnson (1936–2003), American physicist
- Betty Joseph (1917–2013), British psychoanalyst
- Betty Karplus (1925–2021), American science educator
- Betty Klepper (1936–2018), American scientist
- Betty Lindsay (1897–1953), Scottish civil engineer
- Bettie Sue Masters, American biochemist
- Betty Meehan, Australian archaeologist
- Betty Meggers (1921–2012), American archaeologist
- Betty Kellett Nadeau (1905–1999), American paleontologist
- Betty Nesvold, American political scientist
- Betty Paschen (1927–2019), Canadian environmentalist
- Betty Pfefferbaum, American psychiatrist
- Betty Lou Raskin (1924–2010), American chemist
- Betty Ida Roots (1927–2020), British-Canadian zoologist
- Betty Shannon (1922–2017), American mathematician
- Bettie Steinberg (born 1937), American microbiologist
- Betty Steiner (c. 1920–1994), Canadian psychiatrist
- Betty Sullivan (1902–1999), American biochemist
- Betty Tung (born 1935), Hong Kong philanthropist
- Betty Louise Turtle (1941–1990), Australian astronomer and physicist
- Betty Twarog (1927–2013), American biochemist
- Betty von Fürer-Haimendorf (1911–1987), British ethnologist

=== Visual artists and authors ===
- Betty Acquah (born 1965), Ghanaian feminist painter
- Betty Adcock (born 1938), American poet
- Betty Baxter Anderson (1908–1966), American author
- Betty Keener Archuleta (1928–1998), Cherokee-American painter
- Betty Asher (1914–1994), American art collector and dealer
- Betty G. Bailey (1939–2019), American artist
- Betty Baker, American writer
- Betty Ballantine (1919–2019), American publisher, editor and writer
- Betty Batoul (born 1964), Belgian–Moroccan writer
- Betty Beaumont (born 1946), Canadian-American artist
- Betty Hahn Bernbaum (1918–2003), American writer
- Betty G. Birney (born 1947), American writer
- Betty Branch, American visual artist
- Betty Broadbent (1909–1983), American tattoo artist
- Betty Cavanna (1909–2001), American novelist
- Betty Churcher (1931–2015), Australian arts administrator
- Bettie Cilliers-Barnard (1914–2010), South African abstract artist
- Betty Clegg (1926–2009), New Zealand artist
- Betty Curnow (1911–2005), New Zealand painter and printmaker
- Betty Davison, Canadian painter and printmaker
- Betty Eadie (born 1942), American author
- Betty Edwards (born 1926), American artist
- Betty Ehrenborg (1818–1880), Swedish writer
- Betty Elfving (1837–1923), Finnish writer
- Betty Feves (1918–1985), American sculptor
- Betty Freeman (1921–2009), American arts patron and photographer
- Betty Friedan (1921–2006), American feminist writer
- Betty Fussell (born 1927), American writer
- Betty Pat Gatliff (1930–2020), American forensic artist
- Betty Gilderdale (1923–2021), New Zealand children's author
- Betty Goodwin (1923–2008), Canadian artist
- Betty Guy (1920–2016), American painter
- Betty Hahn (born 1940), American photographer
- Betty Harper (born 1946), American artist and illustrator
- Betty Holliday (1925–2011), American painter
- Betty Isaacs (1894–1971), Australian born, New Zealand sculptor and textile designer
- Betty Jeffrey (1908–2000), Australian writer
- Betty Nobue Kano (born 1944), Japanese artist
- Betty Keller (born 1930), American author
- Betty Ladler (1914–2004), English artist and illustrator
- Betty LaDuke (born 1933), American artist and writer
- Betty Lambert (1933–1983), Canadian writer
- Betty Lane (1907–1996), American artist
- Betty Levin (1927–2022), American writer
- Betty Bagby Lewis (1925–2008), American writer
- Betty Jean Lifton (1926–2010), American author
- Betty MacDonald (1908–1958), American author
- Betty Manygoats, Navajo artist
- Betty Manyolo (1938–1999), Ugandan painter and printmaker
- Betty Fible Martin, American writer
- Betty Merken, American painter
- Betty Miller (1910–1965), Irish author
- Betty G. Miller (1934–2012), also known as Bettigee, American artist known as the "Mother of De'VIA"
- Betty Mochizuki (born 1929), Canadian painter and printmaker
- Betty Muffler (born 1944), Aboriginal Australian artist and healer
- Betty Neels (1909–2001), British writer
- Betty Ann Norton (1936–2020), Irish drama teacher
- Betty Paoli (1814–1894), Austrian writer
- Betty Paraskevas (1929–2010), American writer
- Betty Waldo Parish, American painter
- Betty Parsons (1900–1982), American artist, art dealer, and collector
- Betty Paterson (1894–1970), Australian commercial artist, cartoonist and illustrator
- Betty Kuntiwa Pumani, Australian Aboriginal artist
- Betty Rhind, New Zealand artist and art teacher
- Betty Ring (1923–2014), American decorative arts specialist
- Betty Roland (1903–1996), Australian writer of plays, screenplays, novels, children's books and comics
- Betty Lark Ross, American photographer
- Betty Sabo (1928–2016), American painter and sculptor
- Betty Scarpino (born 1949), American wood sculptor
- Bettie M. Sellers (1926–2013), American poet
- Bettie Bendolph Seltzer (1939–2017), American artist
- Betty Shamieh, American playwright, author, screenwriter and actor
- Betty Smith (1896–1972), American playwright and novelist
- Betty Spindler (born c. 1943), American ceramist
- Betty Swords (1917–2005), American cartoonist
- Betty Timms (1886–1980), English writer and sister of Flora Thompson
- Betty Tompkins, American painter
- Betty Trask (1893–1983), English romantic novelist
- Betty Wahl (1924–1988), American novelist and short story writer
- Betty Warren (1920–1993), American painter
- Betty Webb, American novelist
- Betty Willis (1923–2015), American graphic designer
- Betty Woodman (1930–2018), American ceramic artist
- Betty Ren Wright (1927–2013), American novelist
- Betty Wylder (1923–1994), American writer
- Betty Jane Wylie (born 1931), Canadian writer and playwright

=== People in other fields ===
- Madeleine Passot "Betty" (1914–2009), French Resistance agent
- Acid Betty (born 1977), American drag queen
- Betty Abah (born 1974), Nigerian writer and activist
- Betty Alexander (died 1952), Scottish formerly missing female child
- Betty Ang, Filipina businesswoman
- Betty Archdale (1907–2000), English-Australian educator and cricketer
- Betty Azar, American academic
- Betty Batham (1917–1974), New Zealand marine biologist and university lecturer
- Betty Bausch-Polak (1919–2024), Dutch Jewish survivor
- Betty Bentley Beaumont (1828–1892), British author, merchant
- Betty Lou Beets (1937–2000), American murderer
- Betty Jane Belanus, American writer and folklorist
- Betty T. Bennett (1935–2006), American professor of literature
- Betty Berzon (1928–2006), American author and psychotherapist
- Betty June Binnicker (1932–1944), American murder victim
- Betty Birner, American linguist
- Betty Blackman (1931–2022), American librarian and library dean
- Betty Blayton (1937–2016), American activist, advocate, artist, arts administrator and educator, and lecturer
- Beatrice Boeke-Cadbury (1884–1976), English-Dutch social activist, educator and Quaker missionary
- Betty Brader, American fashion illustrator
- Betty Broderick (born 1947), American murderer
- Betty Cameron (1918–2011), Australian World War II servicewoman and WAAAF activist
- Betty Ann Camunez (born 1944), American lawyer
- Betty Boyd Caroli, American historian and biographer
- Betty Carp (1895–1974), American embassy official and intelligence agent
- Betty Catroux, Brazilian-born French former Chanel model
- Betty Clay (1917–2004), British scouting leader
- Betty Reynolds Cobb (1884–1956), American lawyer
- Betty Cohen (born 1956), American businesswoman and television executive
- Betty Comden (1917–2006), American lyricist, playwright and screenwriter
- Betty Cooke (1924–2024), American designer
- Betty Danko (1903–1979), American stuntwoman and stunt double
- Betty Davy (1919–2010), Australian teacher
- Betty Debenham, motorcyclist and author
- Betty Dickey (born 1940), American judge
- Betty Jo Teeter Dobbs (1930–1994), American historian
- Betty Dodson (1929–2020), American sex educator
- Betty Duvall (1845–1891), American spy
- Betty Farrally (1915–1989), English-born Canadian dancer, educator and ballet director
- Betty Fiechter (1896–1971), Swiss businesswoman
- Betty Binns Fletcher (1923–2012), American judge
- Betty Flores (born 1944), American banker and former mayor
- Betty Sue Flowers (born 1947), American English professor and former director
- Betty Ford (1918–2011), First Lady of the United States, wife of Gerald Ford
- Betty Furness (1916–1994), American actress, consumer advocate and current affairs commentator
- Betty Gannett (1906–1970), American Marxist theoretician and editor
- Betty Holtrop-van Gelder (1866–1962), Dutch actress and writer
- Betty Gibson, Canadian educator
- Betty Gillies (1908–1998), American aviator
- Betty Gleim (1781–1827), German teacher, school founder and author
- Betty Mary Goetting, librarian and women's rights activist
- Betty Goudsmit-Oudkerk (1924–2020), Dutch resistance member
- Betty Gough (1920–2018), American foreign service officer
- Betty Grissom (1927–2018), wife of astronaut Gus Grissom
- Betty Groff (1935–2015), American celebrity chef
- Betty Guard (1814–1870), Australian settler of New Zealand
- Betty Halff-Epstein (1905–1991), Swiss entrepreneur
- Betty Hamilton (1904–1994), British Trotskyist
- Betty Hanley (1915–2002), American lighting designer
- Betty Hart (1927–2012), American education researcher
- Betty Heimann (1888–1961), German professor
- Betty Hemings (c. 1735–1807), American slave, mother of Sally Hemings, a slave owned by Thomas Jefferson
- Betty Hester (1923–1998), American correspondent
- Betty Higgins, Papua New Guinean entrepreneur
- Betty Hoag (1914–2002), American art historian
- Betty Holekamp (1826–1902), German colonist and pioneer
- Betty James (1918–2008), American businessperson
- Betty Johnston (1916–1994), British educational administrator
- Betty Mae Tiger Jumper (1923–2011), American nurse
- Betty Kaunda (1928–2013), former First Lady of Zambia
- Betty Kemp (1916–2007), English historian
- Betty Kershaw (born 1943), English nursing administrator
- Betty King, Australian judge
- Betty Kirby-Green (1906–1992), British adventurer and pilot
- Betty Kitchener, Australian mental health educator
- Betty Klimenko (born 1959), Australian businessperson and motorsport team owner
- Betty Koed, American historian
- Betty Korir (born 1971), Kenyan lawyer and banker
- Betty Krawczyk (1928–2025), American author, blogger and environmental activist
- Betty Lalam, Ugandan teacher
- Betty Lasky (1922–2017), American film historian and author
- Betty Limpany (died 1799), British criminal
- Betty Linderoth (1822–1900), Swedish clockmaker
- Betty Loren-Maltese, American former politician and convicted felon
- Betty Lovai, Papua New Guinean academic
- Betty Mahmoody (born 1945), American author and public speaker
- Betty Milan (born 1944), British psychoanalyst and author
- Betty Miller (pilot) (1926–2018), first female pilot to fly solo across the Pacific Ocean
- Betty Mitchell (theatre director) (1896–1976), Canadian theatre director and educator
- Betty C. Monkman (1942–2025), American curator and author
- Betty L. Mullis, American retired Air Force pilot
- Betty S. Murphy (1933–2010), American lawyer
- Betty Neale (1927–2018), American lobbyist and state legislator
- Betty Neumar (1931–2011), American murderer
- Betty Nuovo (1931–2023), American attorney and politician
- Betty Olsen (1934–1968), nurse and missionary
- Betty Ong (1956–2001), American flight attendant
- Betty Thatcher Oros (1917–2001), American automobile designer
- Betty Osceola (born 1967), American environmental activist, educator and airboat captain
- Betty Jean Owens (born 1940), African American kidnapping victim
- Betty Paërl, Dutch trans activist and writer
- Betty Pettersson (1838–1885), Swedish teacher
- Betty Haas Pfister (1921–2011), American aviator
- Bettie Freshwater Pool (1860–1928), American writer, poet and teacher
- Betty Price (arts advisor) (1931–2023), American music teacher
- Betty Quin (1922–1993), Australian screenwriter
- Betty Rea (1904–1965), English sculptor and educationalist
- Betty Reardon (1929–2023), American teacher and academic
- Betty Jamerson Reed, American historian
- Betty Ridley (1909–2005), American church administrator
- Betty Roberts (1923–2011), American judge
- Betty A. Rosa, American educator
- Betty Rowlands (1923–2020), English crime writer
- Bettie Runnels, American lawyer
- Betty Runnels, American lawyer
- Betty Ryan, American game developer and programmer
- Betty J. Sapp, Director of the National Reconnaissance Office
- Betty Bone Schiess (1923–2017), American Episcopal priest
- Betty Shine (1929–2002), English author, opera singer and Spiritualist
- Betty Siegel (1931–2020), American author, and president of Kennesaw State University
- Betty Skelton (1926–2011), American aerobatic pilot, auto test driver and advertising executive
- Betty Reid Soskin (1921–2025), American park ranger
- Betty Lee Sung (1924–2023), American author and academic
- Betty Tom Chu, Chinese-American lawyer, politician and banker
- Betty Glassman Trachtenberg (1933–2023), American college administrator
- Betty J. Turock (born 1936), American librarian and educator
- Betty Tyson (1948–2023), African-American woman murderer
- Betty von Rothschild (1805–1886), patron of the arts and philanthropist
- Betty Temple Watts (1901–1992), scientific illustrator
- Betty Webb (code breaker) (1923–2025), English code breaker
- Betty Wei (1930–2024), Chinese-born American scientist, educator and diplomat
- Betty Jane Williams (1919–2008), American aviator
- Betty Smith Williams, American nurse
- Betty Willsher (1915–2012), British author and graveyard executive
- Betty Wood (1945–2021), British historian and academic
- Betty Young, American educator
- Betty Youngblood, American academic administrator
- Betty Zane (1765–1823), soldier in the American Revolutionary War
- Betty (slave) (c. 1738 – 1795), one of Martha Washington's slaves
- Bettie, a black cook at the Battle of the Alamo - see List of Texian survivors of the Battle of the Alamo

== Fictional characters ==
- Betty (Naked Brothers Band), in the TV series The Naked Brothers Band.
- Betty, the title character of the comic strip Betty (1920–1943) by Charles A. Voight
- Betty, the title character of Yo soy Betty, la fea, a Colombian soap opera, basis for the US TV series Ugly Betty
- Betty DeVille, a fictional character in the animated Nickelodeon show Rugrats
- Atomic Betty or 'Betty Barrett', Cartoon Network-Teletoon's first child superhero
- Boxcar Betty (Boxcar Bertha), a fictional hobo and Industrial Workers of the World organizer
- Brickhouse Betty, the title character from the animated cartoon series featured on Playboy TV and the Internet
- Betty Blue, the main character of the film Betty Blue
- Betty Boop, a Paramount Pictures cartoon character
- Betty Brant, a Marvel Comics supporting character
- Betty Cooper, a comic book character published by Archie Comics
- Betty Draper, a character in the TV series Mad Men.
- Betty Eagleton, a character in the British soap opera Emmerdale
- Betty Gordon, the protagonist of a series of children's novels
- Betty Lou, a muppet character on Sesame Street
- Betty Rizzo, a character in the film Grease (1978), played by Stockard Channing
- Betty Ross, Bruce Banner's love interest in the Hulk comics
- Betty Rubble, a Flintstones character
- Betty Slug, the lead character in the Canadian comic strip Betty
- Betty Suarez, the title character and heroine of the TV series Ugly Betty
- Betty Williams (Coronation Street), in the British soap opera Coronation Street

== Other ==
- Betty, the spaceship in Aliens movie
- BETTY, an alt-rock band from New York City.
- "Betty" (Taylor Swift song), 2020
- "Betty" (AJR song), 2025

== See also ==
- Lady Betty
- Bette (given name)
- Betti (given name)
- Bettye, given name
- Bety, nickname
- Betty (surname)
- Betty (novel), by Tiffany McDaniel
- Bitter Creek Betty, American unidentified murder victim
- Mitsubishi G4M, Japanese WWII naval bomber, codenamed "Betty"
