= Kegakilwe =

Kegakilwe is a surname. Notable people with the surname include:

- Betty Kegakilwe, South African politician
- Gordon Kegakilwe (1967–2020), South African politician

== See also ==
- Kekilli
