= Lady Elizabeth =

Lady Elizabeth is the name of two ships:

- Lady Elizabeth (1869), an iron and timber barque wrecked off Rottnest Island in 1878
- Lady Elizabeth (1879), an iron barque which was damaged off Cape Horn in 1913 and sunk at the Falkland Islands in 1936

== See also ==
- Lady Betty (disambiguation)
