= Betty Keener Archuleta =

Cherokee-American painter

- Born: Betty Lou Keener; May 22, 1928; Pawhuska, Oklahoma, US
- Died: October 31, 1998 (aged 70); Wagoner, Oklahoma, US
- Occupation: painter
- Spouse: Marcos Lawrance Archuleta

Bette Keener Archuleta (May 22, 1928 – October 31, 1998), also called Qued, was a Cherokee-American painter from Pawhuska, Oklahoma. She began painting in her 30s and went on to exhibit across the United States, including at the Museum of New Mexico and at the Inter-Tribal Indian Ceremonials.

Born Betty Lou Keener, she was interested in drawing as a child. She married Marcos Lawrance Archuleta in 1953, and began painting in 1961 with education at the Doris Fitz School of Art in Woodward, Oklahoma. She was active in the local art club. Archuleta's work can be found in a number of private collections.

Archuleta died on October 31, 1998, in Wagoner, Oklahoma.
