= Betty Sims =

American politician

Betty Sims (December 15, 1935 - August 22, 2016) was an American Republican politician in the Missouri General Assembly who served in the Missouri Senate from 1995 until 2002.

Born in St. Louis, Missouri, Sims attended Smith College and Washington University obtaining a bachelor's degree in 1956 and obtaining a Master of Business Administration from Southern Illinois University. She worked as a business consultant.
