= Betty Morgan (singer) =

American vocalist and recording artist

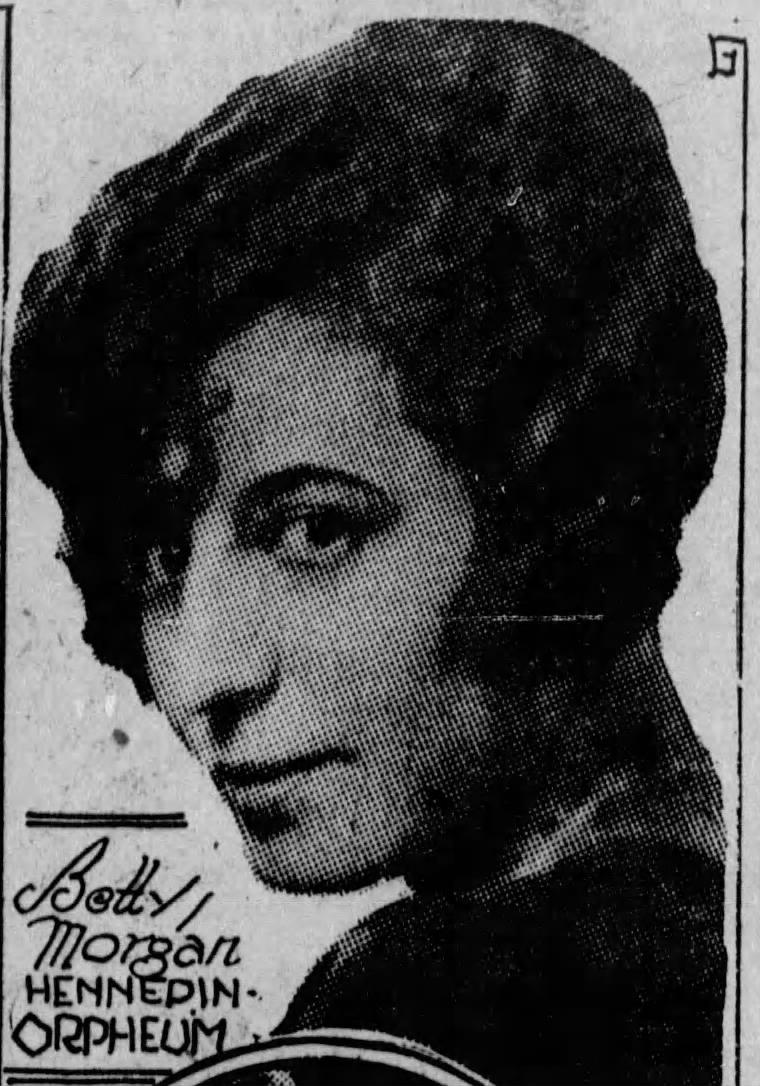
Betty Morgan c. 1925

Betty Morgan was a singer, performer, and recording artist. She recorded on Pathé Records. Jim Morgan played the piano, violin, and banjo. By 1931, Morgan had teamed with Emmet Gilly (formerly Emmet Guilfoyle), formerly of Guilfoyle and Lange (Elsie Lange), with Morgan performing on the piano and Emmet singing and doing comedy.

She and Jim Morgan performed "Don't Bite the Hand That's Feeding You" and "Cleopatra Had a Jazz Band". They performed with a "Collegiate Orchestra". Two songs she recorded are on the jazz record Bring On the Girls (1926-1930) released in 2010 by Challenge Records.

In 1920, Jim and Betty reportedly split and she was to take a few months rest cure after a "nervous spell". She sang and he played piano in the 1929 Vitaphone short film Songs as You Like Them.

A reviewer described her as "clever in her musical recitations." Another review noted they had youth, magnetism, appearance, and ability.

Songs they performed include "Then I Forgot", "Just a Little Bit, Not Just Right", and "That's All I Wanted to Know".

== Discography ==
- "Hoosier Sweetheart"/"What I Call A Pal" on Pathé 32249
- Two records were made of her singing Irving Berlin's "Blue Skies"
