= Betty Kirk West =

American state legislator

Betty Kirk West was a state legislator in Colorado. A Democrat, she represented Pueblo County, Colorado from 1955-1966 in the Colorado House of Representatives. She served three terms. She moved to Pueblo in 1937. She was married.

She was a candidate for state representative in 1954 and 1958. She ran for state senate in 1966. She was a Democrat.

She sponsored a bill to increase compensation for workers hurt on the job.
