= Betty L. Mullis =

Retired Air Force pilot

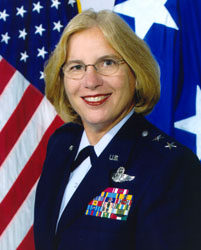
- Born: St. Francis, Kansas
- Occupation: USAF pilot
- Years active: 1972-2005
- Awards: Recipient of the Air Force Distinguished Service Medal & Legion of Merit

Betty L. Mullis is a retired USAF command pilot born in Kansas. She is now a civilian airline pilot. Joining the USAF in 1972, she had a 33-year service career in the USAF, before she retired in 2005. During her service, she was awarded the Legion of Merit and the Air Force Distinguished Service Medal and achieved the rank of Major-General.

== Military career ==
Mullis began her career in the Arkansas Air National Guard (ANG), where she was one of the first women in there to earn her wings. In 1988, she transitioned to the Air Force Reserve. In 1993, Mullis took command of a flying squadron and became the first woman in the Air Force Reserve to do so. She became the first woman in the US Air Force to command a flying wing in 1996. Mullis went on to become the first female command pilot in the US Air Force to reach the rank of Brigadier-General in 2000 and attained Major-General in 2002.

== Awards ==
According to the US Air Force, she has been awarded the following decorations:

- Air Force Distinguished Service Medal
- Legion of Merit
- Meritorious Service Medal with oak leaf cluster
- Air Medal
- Aerial Achievement Medal
- Air Force Commendation Medal with oak leaf cluster
- Air Force Achievement Medal
- Air Force Outstanding Unit Award with "V" device and four oak leaf clusters
- Combat Readiness Medal with four oak leaf clusters
- National Defense Service Medal with bronze star
- Southwest Asia Service Medal with two bronze stars
- Armed Forces Service Medal
- Air Force Longevity Award with silver oak leaf clusters
- Armed Forces Reserve Medal
- Small Arms Marksmanship Ribbon with bronze star
- Air Force Training Ribbon
- Kuwait Liberation Medal (Kingdom of Saudi Arabia)
