= Betty Pickett =

American politician

Betty Pickett is a former member of the Arkansas House of Representatives, where she served from 2003 to 2008. She is a member of the Democratic Party. She lived in Conway, Arkansas.

Before serving in the House of Representatives, she was a member of the Arkansas Board of Education from 1995 to 2002, and the board of directors of the National Association of State Boards of Education from 1997 to 1998.
