= Betty Lempus =

Kenyan long-distance runner

Personal information
- Nationality: Kenyan
- Born: Betty Wilson Lempus; July 9, 1991 (age 35) Kenya
- Occupation: Long-distance runner
- Years active: 2017–2021 (active competitive period before ban)

Sport
- Country: Kenya
- Sport: Athletics
- Events: Marathon, Half marathon, 10 km road

Achievements and titles
- Personal bests: Marathon: 2:23:40 (Shanghai, 2018); Half Marathon: 1:09:25 (Milan, 2017); 10 km road: 32:42 (Piacenza, 2018)

Betty Lempus (born 9 July 1991), also known as Betty Wilson Lempus, is a Kenyan long-distance runner who specializes in the marathon and half marathon.

Lampus is currently serving a five-year ban set to end in October 2027 for anti-doping rule violations.

== Career ==
Lempus began competing internationally around 2017, quickly making a mark in long-distance road events. In 2018, she set her personal best in the marathon, finishing third at the Shanghai International Marathon with a time of 2:23:40. Her progress continued with a win at the 2019 Cracovia Half Marathon.

On 5 September 2021, Lampus finished the Paris Half Marathon in first place but this result was later disqualified due to doping.

== Doping ban ==
In August 2022, the Athletics Integrity Unit (AIU) announced that she had tested positive for triamcinolone acetonide, a prohibited glucocorticoid, from an in-competition sample taken during the Paris Half Marathon.

Further investigation by the AIU, in collaboration with the Anti-Doping Agency of Kenya (ADAK), revealed that Lempus submitted falsified medical documents in an attempt to justify the presence of the substance. A hospital superintendent confirmed the documents were fabricated and that no such treatment had been administered.

She was issued with a five-year ban from competition (reduced from six-years due to her admission of the violations), effective from 14 October 2022 until 14 October 2027. All results from 5 September 2021 onward, including her Paris win, were disqualified.

== Personal bests ==
- Marathon: 2:23:40 – Shanghai, China, 18 November 2018
- Half Marathon: 1:09:25 – Milan, Italy, 19 March 2017
- 10 Kilometres Road: 32:42 – Kapsabet, Kenya, 22 September 2018
