= Betty Wylder =

American writer

- Betty Cutts, later Wylder, from a 1943 newspaper
- Born: Elizabeth Anne Cutts; March 12, 1923; Minneapolis, Minnesota, U.S.
- Died: February 18, 1994 (age 70)
- Occupations: Composer, folklorist, environmentalist, organist

Betty Cutts Wylder (March 12, 1923 – February 18, 1994) was an American composer, organist, environmentalist, and folklorist, based in Long Beach, California, after 1953.

== Early life and education ==
Elizabeth Anne Cutts was born in Minneapolis, Minnesota, the daughter of Charles Rollin Cutts and Frances Marion Tabor Cutts. Her mother was a clubwoman and hospital worker; her father was a music educator. She graduated from high school in Billings, Montana, and attended the University of Montana, where she earned a bachelor's degree in music in 1947.

== Career ==
=== Music ===
With her father and her husband, and UCLA folklorist Wayland Hand, she collected folksongs in Montana in the 1940s, interviewing performers, and making audio recordings and written transcripts. The team's field journals and other materials from this work are in special collections at the University of Montana.

Wylder and her husband moved to Long Beach, California, in 1953, where he was a university professor of English. She was organist at Long Beach Unitarian Church for 29 years. She composed and arranged hymns used in Unitarian Universalist services, including “Enter, Rejoice, and Come In”, “Let It Be a Dance”, and “Love Will Guide Us”. She met singer Undine Wildman at the church; the two women began to perform music together in night clubs. She was a member of the Long Beach Women's History Month Steering Committee in the 1970s and 1980s, and helped create musical reviews for women's history programs.

=== Gardening and environment ===
In Long Beach, Wylder kept an extensive backyard herb garden, with advice and donations from the Long Beach Herb Society. She studied the lore of various herbs, especially their uses in witchcraft and traditional medicine. She was program chair of the Long Beach chapter of Zero Population Growth, and environmental protection chair of the PTA in Long Beach in the 1970s, and lectured on herb lore and environmental issues. She was also awards chair of Long Beach Beautiful.

== Publications ==
- "Songs of the Butte Miners" (1950, with Wayland D. Hand, Charles Cutts, and Robert C. Wylder)
- "Petite Suite for Flute Quartet"
- An Herb Garden of Verses (with Robert C. Wylder)

== Personal life and legacy ==
Cutts married Robert C. Wylder in 1944, while he was serving in the United States Marine Corps. They had three daughters. She died in 1994, at the age of 70, in Long Beach. Wylder Hall at the Long Beach Unitarian Church was named for her and for her husband.
