= Betty Lovai =

Papua New Guinean academic

Betty Lovai, from Papua New Guinea (PNG), is a professor and the executive dean of the School of Humanities and Social Sciences at the University of Papua New Guinea (UPNG).

== Early life ==
Lovai was born on a village mission station in the Western Province of what would become Papua New Guinea, following its Independence in 1975. Her father was a pastor and one of the first people from PNG to be educated as a teacher. He and his family later moved to the capital of PNG, Port Moresby. Lovai later graduated from UPNG and was offered a position at the university as a tutor, subsequently becoming a teaching fellow when she obtained her honours degree in 1989. She required further qualifications in order to advance her teaching career and first obtained a master's degree in social policy and administration from the University of Nottingham in England, and followed that with a PhD from La Trobe University in Melbourne, Australia.

== Career ==
Lovai was appointed as executive dean of the School of Humanities and Social Sciences of UPNG in 2007. In February 2021 she was made acting pro (deputy) vice chancellor (Academic and Student Affairs). While at the university she has taken on many roles on various important committees within PNG and internationally. These include being the chair of the HIV and HIV/AIDS Research Advisory Committee; PNG's representative on the Pacific Women Research Strategy Advisory Group; a member of the Environment Council of Papua New Guinea; a member of the Lands Development Advisory Group; a member of the Women in Political Leadership Reference Group, and member of Coalition of Public Service Women in Leadership. She has also served as a commissioner on the country's Constitutional and Law Reform Commission, as a director on the PNG Sustainable Development Program Ltd Company Board, and on the Council of the PNG National Research Institute.

== Personal life ==
Lovai is married with three children.
