= Betty Swenson =

American politician

Member of the Colorado House of Representatives from the 12th district
- In office January 9, 1985 – January 13, 1993
- Preceded by: Candace Dyer
- Succeeded by: Mary Blue

Personal details
- Born: November 4, 1933 Salina, Kansas
- Died: December 20, 2016 (aged 83) Longmont, Colorado
- Party: Republican

Betty Swenson (November 4, 1933 – December 20, 2016) was an American politician who served in the Colorado House of Representatives from the 12th district from 1985 to 1993.

She died of pancreatic cancer on December 20, 2016, in Longmont, Colorado at age 83.
