= Betty Harris (scientist) =

American explosives scientist (1940–2026)

Betty W. Harris
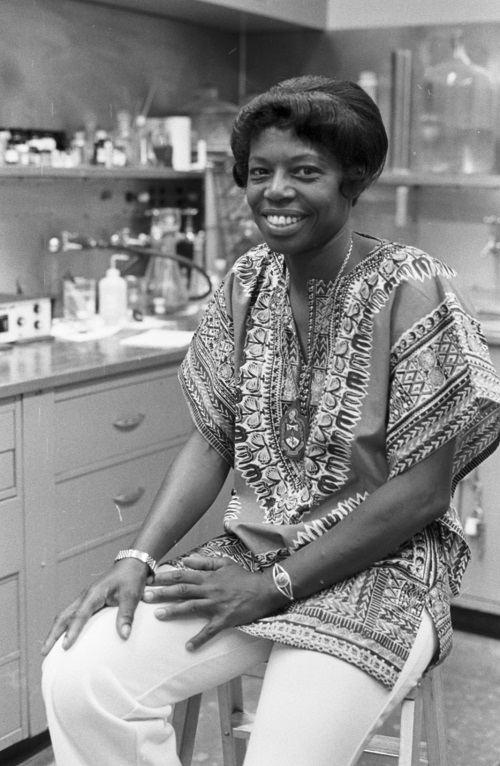
- Born: July 29, 1940; Monroe, Louisiana, U.S.
- Died: October 3, 2026 (aged 86); Los Alamos, New Mexico, U.S.
- Education: Southern University; Atlanta University; University of New Mexico
- Known for: Chemistry of explosives
- Scientific career
- Fields: Chemistry
- Workplaces: Los Alamos National Laboratory

Betty Wright Harris (July 29, 1940 – October 3, 2026) was an American chemist. She is known for her work on the chemistry of explosives completed at Los Alamos National Laboratory. She patented a spot test for detecting 1,3,5-triamino-2,4,6-trinitrobenzene (TATB) in the field, which is used by the Federal Department of Homeland Security to screen for nitroaromatic explosives.

== Early life and education ==
Harris was born on 29 July 1940 in Ouachita Parish, Monroe, Louisiana. She and her 11 siblings were raised on a farm by Henry Hudson "Jake" and Legertha Evelyn Thompson Wright. She attended Union Central High School, enrolling at Southern University at the age of 16. She received her B.S. in chemistry with a minor in mathematics at the age of 19 and subsequently attended Atlanta University, receiving her M.S. degree. She taught as an assistant professor of chemistry and mathematics at Mississippi Valley State University, Southern University and Colorado College.

Harris was awarded a PhD in chemistry from the University of New Mexico in 1975, with a dissertation titled "Reactions of 2-aminopyridine with picryl halides".

== Career ==
After gaining her PhD, she taught chemistry and mathematics at Mississippi Valley State University and Southern University. Harris subsequently moved to do research at Los Alamos National Laboratory, where she worked in the areas of hazardous waste treatment and environmental remediation as well as explosives chemistry. Areas of focus included explosives detection, safing liquids, synthesis and characterization of insensitive high explosives and sensitivity of weathered high explosives. In addition to her research, she has worked in outreach to young people, including working with the Girl Scouts in developing a badge based on chemistry.

During a leave of absence from LANL, Harris was the chief of chemical technology for Solar Turbine Inc., where she managed the technical laboratories and investigated cold-end corrosion of super alloys, which was caused by sulfuric acid and soot in gas turbine engines. For the last eleven years of Harris's career, she worked at the U.S. Department of Energy Office of Classification as a certified document reviewer.

== Awards ==
She received the New Mexico Governor's Trailblazer Award, and was recognized as a distinguished African American Scientist by the National Academy of Sciences. She was a member of Women in Science and Engineering and the American Association for the Advancement of Science, and served as President of the New Mexico Business and Professional Women's Organization. She was a 50-year member of the American Chemical Society.

== Personal life ==
Harris lived in Los Alamos, NM and had three children.

== Patent ==
- Harris, U.S. patent 4,618,452, "Spot test for 1,3,5-triamino-2,4,6-trinitrobenzene, TATB" US patent 4618452, Dr. Betty Harris, "Spot test for 1,3,5-triamino-2,4,6-trinitrobenzene, TATB", published 29 November 1984
