= Kekilli =

Kekilli is a Turkish surname. Notable people with the surname include:

- Sibel Kekilli (born 1980), German actress
- Umut Kekıllı (born 1984), German-Turkish footballer
