= Betty L. Thompson =

American politician (1939–2021)

Betty Lou Bolden Thompson (December 3, 1939 - July 11, 2021) was an American Democratic politician who served in the Missouri House of Representatives.

Born in Helm, Mississippi, she attended Vashon High School, Sumner High School, Hubbards Business College, Harris-Stowe State University, and Washington University in St. Louis.

Betty L. Thompson was a civil rights leader and politician from St. Louis, Missouri. She was born on December 3, 1939, and was raised in a large family of 12 siblings. Thompson was born with alopecia.

Thompson graduated from Sumner High School and attended Harris-Stowe State College.

In 1996, Thompson was elected to the Missouri House of Representatives, where she served for eight years as a member of the Democratic Party where she worked to increase funding for education programs in the state.

Throughout her life, Thompson was actively involved in civil rights and community organizations, including the NAACP and the Urban League. She also served on the boards of several organizations, including the National Conference of State Legislatures and the National Black Caucus of State Legislators.

Thompson died on July 11, 2021, at the age of 81.
