= Betty Isaacs =

New Zealand sculptor and textile designer (1894–1971)

- Born: 2 September 1894; Hobart
- Died: 4 January 1971 (aged 76); New York City
- Occupation: Sculptor, textile designer, librarian
- Employer: Cooper Union
- Spouse(s): Julius Isaacs

Betty Isaacs (2 September 1894 – 4 January 1971), (born Betty Lewis), was an Australian born, New Zealand sculptor, artist and textile designer.

== Early life and education ==
Isaacs was born on 2 September 1894 in Hobart, Tasmania. The Lewis family faced hardships early in her life, including the death of her father when she was two. Her New Zealand born mother moved the family back to Wellington, New Zealand, where she later remarried.

After her mother's death during Isaacs teenage years, she took on the responsibility of caring for her younger siblings. A spinal injury in her youth led her to seek medical treatment in New York, United States of America, where she underwent a successful operation and later moved to live and work.

== Career ==
Isaacs worked as a librarian in New York, where she met her husband, Julius Isaacs, in 1921. He encouraged her to pursue her artistic ambitions. She studied at the Elverhøj Art Colony in New York, Kunstgewerbeschule (School of Arts and Crafts) in Vienna, and later studied and taught at the Cooper Union School of Art in Manhattan, New York.

Her design work included textiles and wallpapers characterized by bright colours and intricate patterns, often inspired by nursery rhymes and natural scenes.

After years in commercial design, Isaacs shifted her focus to ceramics and discovered her passion for sculpture. She became a self-taught sculptor, creating expressive works in clay, stone, and wood, often depicting animals and human figures. She was a prolific creator and designed numerous textile and rug designs, drawings, sculptures and ceramics over her lifetime.

Isaacs held her first solo exhibition in 1953 at the Hacker Gallery in New York and her work is held in many private collections worldwide.

== Death and legacy ==
Isaacs died on 4 January 1971 in New York City.

Betty and Julius Isaacs were patrons of the arts and developed a significant personal art collection. Upon their deaths, their collection was bequeathed to the National Art Gallery of New Zealand, consisting of over 200 items, primarily featuring Betty's sculptures and designs, as well as paintings by Julius and notable New Zealand artists.
