= Betty Cole Dukert =

American television producer (1927–2024)

- Born: May 9, 1927
- Died: March 16, 2024 (aged 96); Bethesda, Maryland, U.S.
- Occupation: Television producer
- Notable work: Meet the Press

Betty Cole Dukert (May 9, 1927 – March 16, 2024) was an American television producer.

She worked as a secretary before being hired as an associate producer at Meet the Press in 1956. She later became executive producer, holding that title until retirement.

Dukert died on March 16, 2024, aged 96, at a retirement home in Bethesda, Maryland from complications of Alzheimer's disease.
