= Betty Collette =

Veterinary pathologist

Betty Elaine Collette
- Betty Collette on the cover of Jet magazine April 3, 1958
- Born: December 5, 1930; Asheville, North Carolina
- Died: February 5, 2017 (aged 86)
- Education: Morgan State College, Catholic University

Betty Elaine Collette (December 5, 1930 – February 5, 2017 ) was a veterinary pathologist from Asheville, North Carolina. She attended Stephens-Lee High School. It is believed she earned her bachelor's degree in biology from Morgan State University, and her Ph.D. in bacteriology from Catholic University of America.

== Research ==
Collette was the only African-American pathology researcher at Georgetown University School of Medicine in the 1950s.

Collette was described as an "animal-lover" and often kept animal skulls as a hobby. Her research focused on hypertension in animals, often using "white mice, guinea pigs, dogs, rabbits and other animals" in her research. Later in her career, she was a professor at Howard University.
