= Betty Oberacker =

American pianist

- Born: Betty Oberacker; October 17, 1932; Cleveland, Ohio
- Died: June 28, 2024 (aged 91) Santa Barbara, California
- Occupation: Musician
- Instrument: Piano

Betty Oberacker (1932–2024) was an American pianist and piano pedagogue.

Internationally renowned for her interpretations of traditional and contemporary repertoire as both a soloist and a chamber musician, she performed in several European countries as well as abroad (Israel, Asia, Australia, Mexico, and the United States). She worked as a professor of piano and chamber music at the Ohio State University and the University of California, Santa Barbara. Oberacker has recorded for several record labels such as Century (Schönberg's Pierrot Lunaire), MIT Great Performances Archives ( A Bach Commemorative Recital), Clavier Records (Bach's Well-Tempered Clavier), MMC (Diemer's Piano Concerto), Orion (Chamber Music of Emma Lou Diemer), and VMM Records (John Biggs' Variations on a Theme of Shostakovich).

In her repertoire, Mozart and Bach stand out. She is known for her interpretations of both traditional and contemporary music. Many composers have dedicated their work to her. The New York Times once noted, "Her intelligence and warmth not only showed us the design of Bach's inner workings, but it also allowed us to feel them in sensuous ways."
