= Betty Flehinger =

Biostatistician

Betty Jeanne Flehinger-Schultz (née Isaacs, c. 1922 – May 21, 2000) was a biostatistician known for her research on clinical decision support systems and cancer screening. She worked for many years for IBM Research.

== Education and career ==
Betty Jeanne Isaacs is a 1941 graduate of Barnard College, where she was founder and president of the college's physics club. She earned a master's degree in physics from Cornell University in 1942 with a thesis titled A Revision of the Isotopic Mass Scale. As Betty Flehinger, she completed a Ph.D. in 1961 from Columbia University. Her dissertation, A General Model for the Reliability Analysis of Systems under Various Preventive Maintenance Policies, was supervised by Ronald Pyke.

She joined IBM's Thomas J. Watson Research Center in 1957, initially working on data analysis for the prediction of the reliability of computing devices. By 1964 she was manager for probability and statistics in the mathematical sciences department of the center.

== Recognition ==
Flehinger's work with Ralph Engle developing the HEME computer system using Bayesian statistics to diagnose blood diseases has been named as a landmark by the International Medical Informatics Association. Flehinger was named a Fellow of the American Association for the Advancement of Science in 1968, and a Fellow of the American Statistical Association in 1996.
