= Betty Olsson =

Swedish suffragist and peace activist

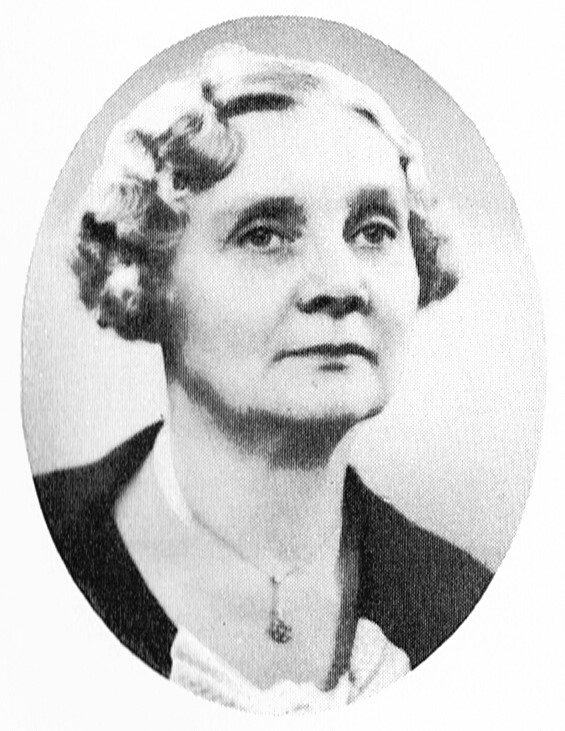
Betty Olsson

Betty Eugenia Olsson (1871–1950) was a Swedish suffragist and peace activist from Norrköping where she was employed as a bookkeeper in the textile industry. In 1916, she joined the local branch of the Swedish Association for Women's Suffrage (LKPR) and in the 1930s was president of the IKFF, the Swedish chapter of the Women's International League for Peace and Freedom. In the 1930s, she fought against Nazi propaganda and the threat of war and became involved in anti-Nazi resistance.

== Early life ==
Born on 28 June 1871 in Norrköping, Betty Eugenia Olsson was the daughter of Frans Olof Olsson, a bookkeeper, and his wife Jenny Eugenia née Stenström. She was one of the family's five children.

== Career ==
Adopting her father's interest in accounting, Olsson became a bookkeeper and cashier in Norrköping's textile industry, working first for Richard Wahring AB and later for Förenade Yllefabrikerna AB where she remained until her retirement in 1931.

In parallel she became interested in women's rights, including the right to vote. In 1916, she joined the local branch of the suffrage association LKPR, participating in the national drive which in May 1919 led to parliamentary approval of a woman's right to vote. She became chair of the local branch of the Föreningen frisinnade kvinnor (FFK, Free-minded Women's Association). Closely related to the liberal political party Frisinnade Landsföreningen, the FFK supported both women's rights and pacifism. Prominent members included the peace activists Anna Kleman, Ada Nilsson and Elin Wagner.

In the 1930s, Olsson chaired the Norrköping IKFF, representing Sweden's support from the Women's International League for Peace and Freedom. She was active in other pacifist groups, including the Fredrika Bremer Association and Världssamling för fred, the Swedish component of the International Peace Campaign. She later fought against Nazi propaganda and, as a member of the Förbundet Kämpande Demokrati (Fighting Democracy Foundation), she sought to encourage anti-Nazi resistance.

Betty Olsson died in Norrköping on 25 April 1950 and was buried in the local cemetery.
