= Betty Swords =

American cartoonist

- Born: Elizabeth Edgemond; 17 August 1917 California
- Died: 14 August 2005 (aged 87)
- Area: Cartoonist

Betty Swords (1917–2005) was an American cartoonist whose work appeared in the Saturday Evening Post, Redbook, Good Housekeeping, Ladies Home Journal, Changing Times, and others, usually using her own gags but sometimes from other writers. She also wrote gags for Dennis the Menace and others. Her humorous writing appeared in McCall’s, Modern Maturity, The Christian Science Monitor, and others.

Swords was raised in Oakland, California, earned her Bachelor of Fine Arts at University of California, Berkeley and did graduate work the San Francisco Academy of Advertising Art.
