= Betty George =

American singer

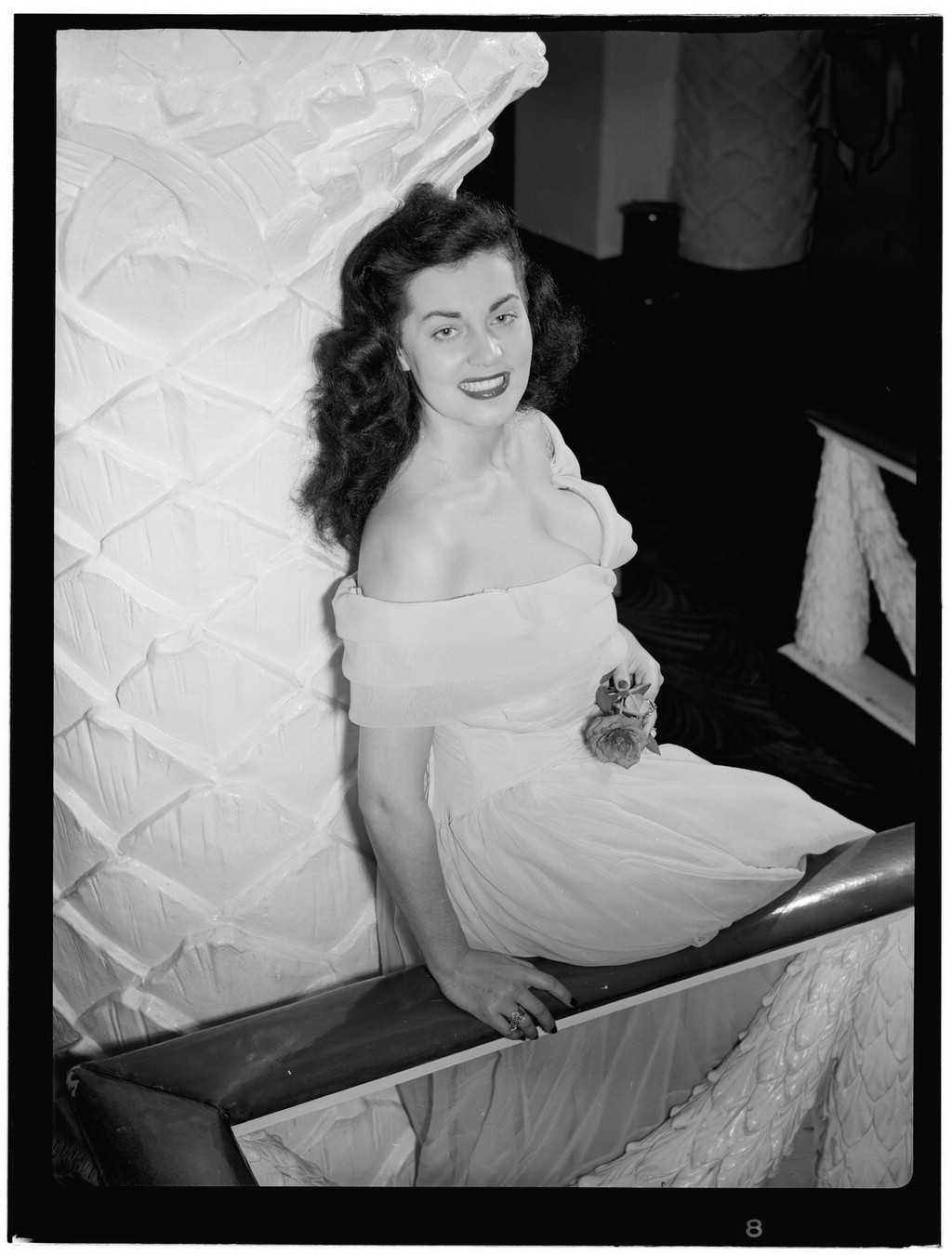
- George c. 1947

Background information
- Born: April 11, 1926; Manchester, New Hampshire, United States
- Died: November 16, 2007 (aged 81) North Greenbush, New York, United States
- Genres: Jazz
- Occupation: Singer
- Formerly of: Casa Loma Orchestra

Betty George (April 11, 1926 – November 16, 2007) was an American singer of Greek descent. She was a soloist during the big band era.

== Biography ==
George went to New York, where she sang with big bands including those of Artie Shaw, Glenn Miller, and Tommy Dorsey.

She worked for over 16 years with Milton Berle, and in 1953-1954 was a regular on The Jerry Lester Show, a variety program on ABC television.

Her Broadway credits include Ankles Aweigh (1955), As the Girls Go (1948), and Heaven on Earth (1948).

George recorded for Decca Records and CBS Studios.
