= Bettie Johnson Mbayo =

Liberian journalist

- Occupation: Journalist

Bettie Johnson Mbayo is a Liberian journalist and a senior reporter at FrontPage Africa. In 2019 she won the Health Reporter and Women Rights Reporter of the year from the Press Union of Liberia.

Mbayo obtained a Bachelor of Arts (BA) degree in Mass Communication from the United Methodist University in Liberia and a Master's in Public administration.
