= Betty Ann Dittemore =

Colorado politician

Betty Ann Harper Dittemore (November 12, 1919 - November 22, 2000) was a politician in Colorado. A Republican, she served in the Colorado House of Representatives and as a County Commissioner in Arapahoe County. She served in the Colorado House from 1968 to 1978 and was the first woman to serve from Arapahoe County and later the county's first female commissioner. She led the successful effort to amend Colorado's constitution to guarantee equality for women in public service in 1972. In 1977, she was the first Republican women to seek nomination for lieutenant governor. She is also credited with co-leading HB1041 which allowed cities and states to legislate development within their borders.

In 1969 she proposed changing the state song to "Colorado", replacing "Where The Columbines Grow".

She was photographed with Regis Groff in the 1970s.
