= Betty Manygoats =

Navajo artist

- Born: 1945 (age 80–81); Shoto/Cow Springs, on the Navajo Nation
- Known for: pottery, beadwork, weaving
- Spouse: William Manygoats

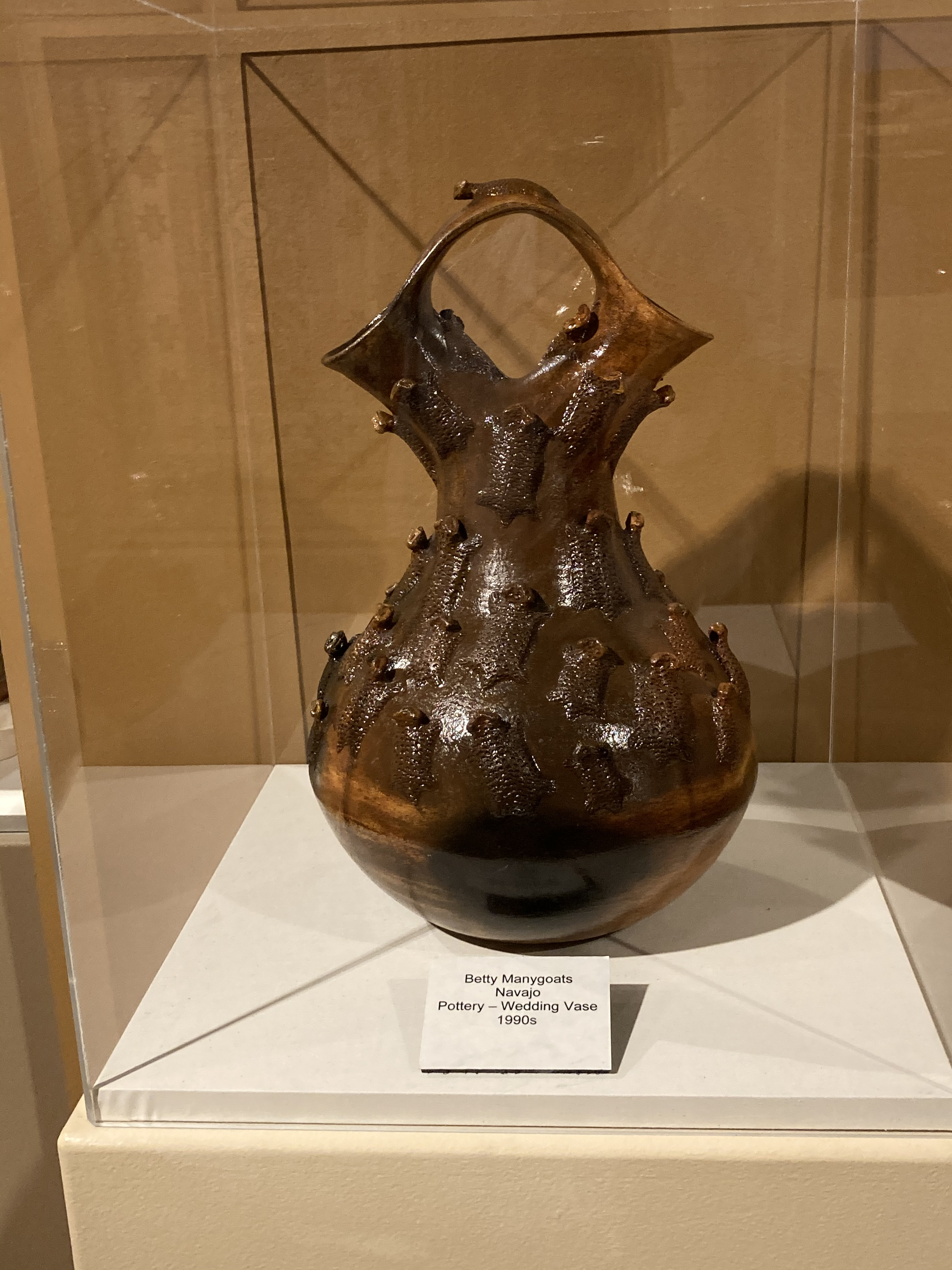
Wedding Vase by Betty Manygoats at the Museum of Texas Tech University in Lubbock, Texas.

Betty Manygoats (born 1945) is a Navajo artist known for her ceramic work. She lives and works at Cow Springs on the Navajo Nation in Arizona in the American Southwest.

== Biography ==
Manygoats was born at Shoto/Cow Springs, on the Navajo Nation. She was born into the Tàchiiʼnii clan. She and her husband William Manygoats, whom she married in 1963, have ten children. Many of her grown children are also potters. She is also known as Betty Barlow.

== Art work ==
Manygoats learned the art of silversmithing, weaving and beadwork when she was growing up. When she was in her twenties, she learned to make traditional functional pottery from her grandmother, Grace Barlow. As her work progressed, she developed a style that exaggerated the surface decoration, motifs, and shapes of traditional Navajo pottery. In the 1970s, Manygoats developed a style of working that incorporated the application of hand-built clay horned toads which became her trademark.

== Collections ==
Manygoats' work is included in the collection of the Renwick Gallery of the Smithsonian American Art Museum. She is also represented in the collections of the National Museum of the American Indian. and the William C. and Evelyn M. Davies Gallery of Southwest Indian Art at the Museum of Texas Tech University.
