= Betty A. Prashker =

American editor (died 2024)

- Born: 1924 or 1925
- Died: July 30, 2024 (aged 99)
- Employer: Crown Publishing

Betty A. Prashker (died July 30, 2024) was an American editor and publishing executive. She was the senior vice president and editor-in-chief at Crown Publishing. She was one of the first women to work in a major executive role at a publisher.
