= Betty W. Holz =

American mathematician (1919–2005)

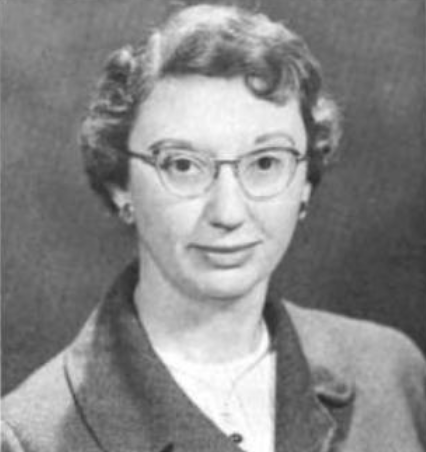
- Betty W. Holz, from a 1962 publication of the United States Army
- Born: Betty Rose Weber; September 15, 1919; Florida
- Died: September 3, 2005 (aged 85); Maryland
- Occupation: Mathematician

Betty Rose Weber Holz (September 15, 1919 – September 3, 2005) was an American mathematician who worked for the United States Army.

== Early life and education ==
Betty Rose Weber was born in Florida, the daughter of William Wilson Weber and Rosalie I. Langford Weber. Her father was a math professor.

Weber earned a bachelor's degree in mathematics from Columbia College in 1940. She completed a master's degree in mathematics at the University of South Carolina in 1949, and pursued further graduate studies at the University of North Carolina and at American University. As a student, she won a medal for excellence in piano performance.

== Career ==
Holz taught mathematics at the University of South Carolina, and was an engineer with Melpar, a defense contractor. Beginning in 1954, she was an analyst for the United States Army's Operations Research Office, later the Research Analysis Corporation, in Washington, D.C. In 1961 she and Edward M. Girard represented the US at the American-British-Canadian Ad Hoc Working Group on War Gaming and Simulation when it met in London. In the 1960s and 1970s, she helped to develop ELIM (the Enlisted Loss Inventory Model) and COMPLIP (Computation of Manpower Programs Using Linear Programming), early computer programs for modeling military manpower and logistics.

Holz was a member of Phi Beta Kappa, the Society for Industrial and Applied Mathematics, the Operations Research Society of America, and the American Mathematical Society.

== Selected publications ==
- "Analysis of Means for Moving Logistic Cargo from Ship to Shore" (1957, with William H. Sutherland)
- Table of Exponentially Distributed Pseudo-random Numbers (1959, with Charles E. Clark)
- Operational mobility of armored units: The ROAM simulation (1961)
- Holz, Betty W. (1969-03-01). An Approach for Modeling the US Transportation System for Analysis of Emergency Capability (Report). DTIC AD0698202.
- Holz, Betty W.; Phillips, Paul D. (1969). Improved Models to Measure Army Personnel Readiness (Report). S2CID 109119409. DTIC AD0698019.
- Holz, B.; Emberger, John J; Hunt, Winifred A.; Maloney, M.; Schlosser, Robert J. (1973). The ELIM-COMPLIP System of Manpower Planning Models. Volume II. Description of Computational Procedures (Report). S2CID 108227768. DTIC AD0771969.
- Holz, B.; Emberger, John J; Hunt, Winifred A.; Maloney, M.; Schlosser, Robert J. (1973). The ELIM-COMPLIP System of Manpower Planning Models. Volume I. General Overview (Report). S2CID 108144425. DTIC AD0771119.
- Weigel, Henry S.; Holz, Betty W.; Midlam, Kenneth D.; Koenig, Lawrence D. (1 May 1977). NPS Gains Module of the ELIM-COMPLIP System of Manpower Planning Models (Report). DTIC ADA042191.
- Holz, Betty W.; Wroth, James M. (1980). "Improving Strength Forecasts: Support for Army Manpower Management". Interfaces. 10 (6): 37–52. doi:10.1287/inte.10.6.37. JSTOR 25060010.
- "The Army's Approach to Improved Strength Forecasting" (1981, with James M. Wroth)
- Eversheim, W.; Holz, B. (1982). "Computer Aided Programming of NC-Machine Tools by Using the System AUTAP-NC". CIRP Annals. 31 (1): 323–327. doi:10.1016/S0007-8506(07)63321-6.
- "Technologies for Person-Job Matching" (1986, with Edward J. Schmitz)

== Personal life ==
Weber married chemical engineer Eugene Russell Holz in 1952. Her husband died in 1955. She died in 2005, aged 85 years, in Maryland.
