= Betty Branch (artist) =

American visual artist

Betty Branch is a contemporary American visual artist known for public works, sculpture, painting, and drawing.

== Background ==
Betty Branch earned her Bachelor of Arts in Studio Art (1979) and Master of Arts in Liberal Studies (1987) from Hollins University and completed additional studies with artists Denis Knight and Georgiana Mailoff, and at Miles and Generalis Sculptural Services. She lives and works in Roanoke, Virginia. Her first retrospective exhibition, Betty Branch: Through the Crow's Eye, a Retrospective, presented the artist's work in bronze, marble, porcelain, works on paper, and performance pieces.

== Selected solo and group exhibitions ==
- Betty Branch: Through the Crow's Eye, a Retrospective, September 17 – November 21, 2009, Eleanor D. Wilson Museum at Hollins University, Roanoke, VA
- Betty Branch, 1998, Nelson Gallery, Lexington, VA
- Sculpture by Betty Branch, 1994, du Pont Gallery, Washington and Lee University, Lexington, VA
- The Box: Remembering the Gift, 1993, Santa Fe, New Mexico
- Women and Children: Difficult Truths, 1990, Southern Seminary College, Greenville, SC

== Collections ==
- Taubman Museum of Art, Roanoke, VA
- Castlegar Sculpturewalk, Castlegar, BC, Canada
- Brookgreen Gardens, Murrells Inlet, SC
- Roanoke Valley Libraries, Roanoke, VA
- Eleanor D. Wilson Museum at Hollins University, Roanoke, VA
