= Betty Nesvold =

American political scientist (1922–1992)

- Born: 1922
- Died: 1992 (aged 69–70)
- Education: San Diego State University; University of Minnesota
- Scientific career
- Fields: Political science
- Workplaces: San Diego State University

Betty Nesvold (1922–1992) was an American political scientist. Nesvold was the Chair of the Department of Political Science at San Diego State University, where she was also the Associate Dean in the College of Arts and Letters. Nesvold was also the President of the Western Political Science Association, and the first woman to be the Chair of the Inter-university Consortium for Political and Social Research. Her research largely focused on comparative political violence.

== Life and career ==
Nesvold was born in 1922. While in her forties, she studied at San Diego State University. She then obtained a master's degree at San Diego State University, writing her thesis on comparative political violence, followed by a doctorate at the University of Minnesota.

In 1967, Nesvold joined the political science faculty at San Diego State University. At San Diego State University she served as the chair of the political science department, helped to found the women's studies department, and was Associate Dean for the College of Arts and Letters. Her research largely focused on comparative political violence. Nesvold also took leadership roles in professional organizations. She soon became the treasurer of the American Political Science Association, and president of the Western Political Science Association. At the American Political Science Association, she was a founding member of the Women's Caucus, of which she also served as president. Nesvold was the first woman to be the Chair of the Inter-university Consortium for Political and Social Research.

Nesvold died in 1992. Nesvold is the namesake of the Betty Nesvold Scholarship in the Women's Studies Department at San Diego State University. The Western Political Science Association also awards a prize named after her, called the Betty Nesvold Women and Politics Award.

== Selected works ==
- "Social change and political violence: Cross-national patterns", in Violence in America, co-authored (1969)
- Macro-quantitative analysis: conflict, development, and democratization, co-authored (1971)
- "The comparative study of revolution and violence", Comparative Politics, co-authored (1973)
