= Betty Youngblood =

American academic administrator

Betty Youngblood was President of Lake Superior State University in Sault Ste. Marie, MI from 2002 to 2007. Previously she was President and Professor of political science at Western Oregon University and chancellor of the University of Wisconsin-Superior. She was preceded as president of Lake Superior State by President Arbuckle and succeeded by Dr. Rodney L. Lowman.
