= Bettie Cadou =

American journalist

- Born: 1 January 1936; Bainbridge, Indiana, U.S.
- Died: 2002 (aged 66)
- Occupations: Journalist, Photojournalist
- Notable credit: CASPAR Award
- Children: 3

Elizabeth "Bettie" Stickler Fruits Cadou (January 1, 1936, Bainbridge, Indiana – 2002) was an American journalist. She is best known for being the first female reporter to be given a silver credential badge that permits access to the pit and garage areas of the Indianapolis Motor Speedway for the 1971 Indianapolis 500. Cadou is equally known for her investigative reporting around the state of Indiana, covering the Indiana General Assembly, the Indianapolis Colts, and national profiles of race car drivers. She was elected into the Indiana Journalism Hall of Fame in 2006 and has a journalism scholarship in her name in the Department of Journalism at Indiana University – Purdue University Indianapolis.

== Early life ==
Cadou's mother was an amateur poet, artist and classical pianist who worked as a telephone operator; her father was a police officer. Cadou moved with her mother and siblings several times as she grew up in the Crawfordsville area. She attended Indiana University Bloomington and received a bachelor of arts in English.

== Career ==
Cadou worked for a number of Indianapolis publications, including the Indianapolis News, the Hammond Times, and Indianapolis Monthly. Her byline appeared frequently in many national publications, including The New York Times, Sports Illustrated, and countless racing publications.

She taught at journalism at both Indiana University – Purdue University Indianapolis and Butler University. On both campuses, Bettie's popularity among students – whom she called her “chickadees” – was legendary.

== Personal life ==
In between her beginnings in Bainbridge and her Butler and IUPUI years, Cadou became the mother of two daughters and a son: Kitty, Laura, and Hadley.

== Honors and awards ==
- CASPAR Award

== Organizations ==
- American Auto Racing Writers and Broadcasters Association
