= Betty Jane Belanus =

American writer and folklorist

- Education: Smith College and Indiana University Bloomington
- Occupations: Writer, curator, folklorist
- Years active: 1987 -
- Organization: Smithsonian Institution
- Notable work: Caravan to America

Betty Jane Belanus is an American writer and folklorist. Belanus completed her graduate work in folklore at Indiana University and has been with the Smithsonian Institution since 1987, ultimately working with the Smithsonian Center for Folklife and Cultural Heritage as an education specialist. Part of her work with the Smithsonian has been the curating of programs for the Smithsonian's annual Folklife Festival, including the 2009 Wales program. She has worked on "Smithsonian Inside Out", on the occupational life of the Smithsonian.

== Biography ==
Belanus received a B.A. in American Studies from Smith College in 1977. After taking a class on folklore with George Carey at University of Massachusetts Amherst, she began to pursue folklore as an academic discipline. Immediately after graduating from Smith, she enrolled in the folklore program at Indiana University Bloomington, where she received her M.A. and Ph.D in Folklore.

While in the graduate program at Indiana, Belanus became interested in the sub-field of public sector folklore; she worked for a time in the Mathers Museum of World Cultures at Indiana University, then sought a career in public folklore. She spent two years (1982–84) working for the Indiana Arts Commission as the state's folk arts coordinator.

Belanus' relationship with the Smithsonian began in 1986 when she worked as a presenter for the Tennessee program as a part of the Smithsonian Folklife Festival. She began work on curating the 1988 program on Massachusetts in 1987. She then worked for the Smithsonian’s Office of Folklife Programs in various contract positions before forming the position of Education Specialist, a role co-established and shared with Marjorie Hunt.

As part of her work with the Smithsonian, Belanus curated programs for the Folklife Festival, including Family Farms in the Heartland (1991), New Hampshire (1999), and The Roots of Virginia Culture (2007). As part of her work on the 2009 program on Wales, Belanus lived in Cardiff and worked as a visiting research fellow at the Centre for the Study of Media and Culture in Small Nations at the University of Glamorgan.

In addition to her curating duties, which includes research, fieldwork, finding and arranging for visiting presenters and how programs should be presented, Belanus has developed education programs, including teaching seminars, and education kits. Much of her teaching work is focused on elementary and high school education programs and how teachers for these age groups can use folklore in the classroom.

== Selected works ==
- Belanus, Betty J. (1994). "Serving the Public: An Assessment of Work in the Public Sector Folklore". In Jones, Michael Owen (ed.). Putting Folklore to Use. Publications of the American Folklore Society, New Series. University Press of Kentucky. pp. 201–213. ISBN 978-0-8131-0818-6.
- Caravan to America: Living Arts of the Silk Road, John S. Major & Betty J. Belanus, Chicago : Cricket Books, 2002, ISBN 978-0-613-76180-2
- Seasonal: A Novel, Round Barn Press, 2004, ISBN 978-0-9716852-0-8

Belanus has produced about 55 works.
