= Betty Gleim =

German author (1781–1827)

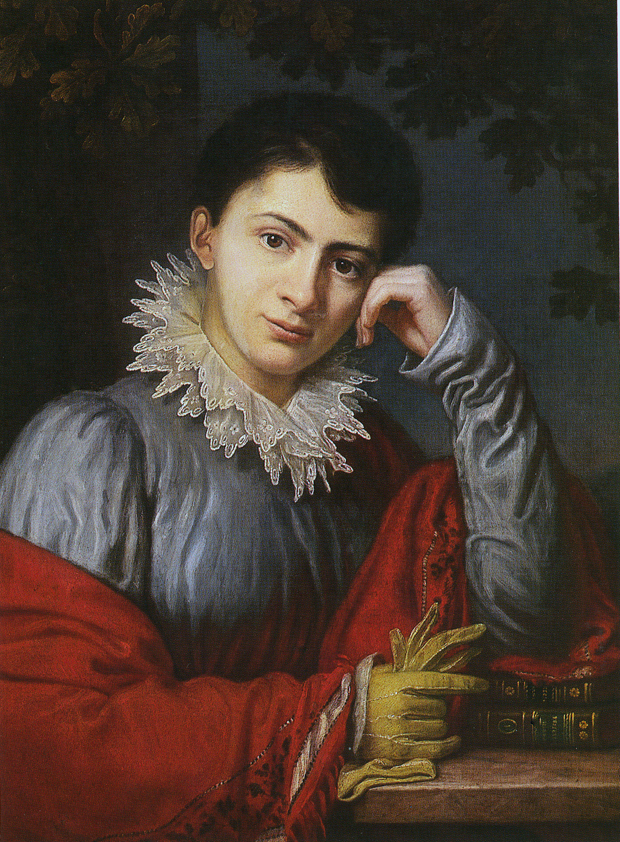
- Betty Gleim, painting by de:Georg Friedrich Adolph Schöner, c. 1815. Focke Museum
- Born: 13 August 1781; Bremen, Germany
- Died: 27 March 1827 (aged 45); Bremen, Germany
- Occupations: Teacher, school founder, author
- Known for: Founding schools for girls; advocating practical education for women

Betty Gleim (13 August 1781 – 27 March 1827), also called as Ilsabetha Gleim, was a German teacher, school founder and author. She founded schools for girls and advocated the importance of practical education for a woman's independent life.

== Biography ==
Born in Bremen, Germany, on 13 August 1781, Betty Gleim was the daughter of the wine merchant Johann Christian Gottlieb Gleim (1744–1801) and his wife Adelheid Tidemann (1760–1801). She was influenced by the writings of German poet Johann Wilhelm Ludwig Gleim (1719–1803), and the educational reformers, the Evangelical theologians Johann Caspar Häfeli (1754–1811) and Johann Ludwig Ewald (1748–1822).

She was a pedagogical self-taught and founded an educational institution for girls on 14 October 1806 in Bremen. She taught history and geography. She later introduced the teaching of mathematics and physics. To encourage practical education for girls, she also started vocational training, and created machines and workshop facilities. Her pedagogical uses frequent natural metaphors advocate for a program of educational learning that allows individuals to develop skills in their own unique ways. However, she faced some controversies as a result of the resistance from the authorities and the disinterest shown by the local residents for schooling of girls. Following this, she decided to hand over the school to her first helper Louisa Köhler in 1815. Soon after, she undertook a long journey through Holland to England, to visit her relatives.

In 1816 she moved to Elberfeld at the request of a relative to set up a school for girls from the upper classes. However, in 1817, this institution also collapsed, because of the disputes with one of her trusted teachers. After this failure in building educational institution for girls, she started showing interest in art and took drawing lessons. She stayed in Switzerland and studied the drawing methods of Johann Heinrich Pestalozzi.

In the following period, she visited Frankfurt and Munich, and met the inventor of lithography Alois Senefelder. In April 1819 she got approval from the Senate of the city of Bremen to establish the first lithographic print shop in Bremen. She opened it in May 1819, and brought lithographers and printers from Munich. After just a few months, this experiment also failed since the girls and women didn’t take up this new activity as she had expected. She subsequently transferred the company to other in 1820.

Meanwhile, in October 1819, she upgraded her former school into a college for girls.

She was also associated with women's movement in Bremen.

She died in Bremen on 27 March 1827.

== Publications ==
In addition to teaching and managing the school, she became involved in writing. Until 1816, she published a number of textbooks and pedagogical treatises in quick succession. Her publications include

- Erzählungs- und Bilderbuch zum Vergnügen und zur Belehrung der Jugend (1807),
- Kochbuch (1808),
- Lesebuch zur Uebung in der Declamation (2 parts, 1809/10),
- Fundamentallehre oder Terminologie der Grammatik nach Pestalozzi'schen Grundsätzen (1810),
- Erfahrungen und Ansichten über Erziehungsstitute und Schulen (1811),
- Tellus oder Lehrbuch der Geographie nebst Kosmomathie oder kurzgefaßter Darstellung des Weltgebäudes (1813),
- Einige Gedanken über Stilübungen; oder Beantwortung der Frage: ist es zweckmäßig, die Jugend praktische Versuche im Versbau anstellen zu lassen? ( 1813 ),
- Erziehung und Unterricht des weiblichen Geschlechts, ein Buch für Eltern und Erzieher and
- Erziehung und Bildung des weiblichen Geschlechts (1814).
