= Betty Noël =

French-born Luxembourgish footballer (born 1988)

Personal information
- Date of birth: 1 September 1988 (age 38)
- Place of birth: Paris, France
- Height: 1.77 m (5 ft 10 in)
- Position: Defender

Team information
- Current team: FC Differdange 03
- Number: 17

Senior career*
| Years | Team | Apps | (Gls) |
| 2008–2009 | Bon Conseil | | |
| 2010–2011 | Paris CA | | |
| 2011–2013 | PSG B | 39 | (3) |
| 2013–2014 | Issy | 6 | (0) |
| 2014–2015 | Paris CA | | |
| 2015–2016 | Tremblay | 3 | (0) |
| 2017–2021 | Saint-Denis | 11 | (0) |
| 2021–2022 | Racing Union | 9 | (1) |
| 2022–2024 | Bettembourg | 14 | (0) |
| 2024–2026 | Mamer 32 | 31 | (3) |
| 2026– | Differdange 03 | | |

International career^{‡}
| 2019– | Luxembourg | 4 | (0) |
- * Club domestic league appearances and goals as of 8 June 2026 ‡ National team caps and goals as of 19 June 2021

Betty Noël (born 1 September 1988) is a French-born Luxembourgish footballer who plays as a defender for Dames Ligue 1 club FC Differdange 03 and the Luxembourg women's national team.

== Club career ==
Noël started playing football as a child in Australia. Back to France she joined the under 16 team of VGA Saint-Maur, before joining the reserve team of Paris Saint-Germain. She then played in Division 2 in Issy-les-Moulineaux (France) before getting a severe knee injury. After surgery, Noël joined Division 2 Tremblay FC and RC Saint-Denis (France).

In 2021, Noël moved to Luxembourg to play for Racing Union, Bettembourg, Mamer, and Differdange 03.

== International career ==
Noël made her senior debut for Luxembourg on 9 November 2019 during a 0–5 friendly loss to Kosovo. She started the game against Bulgaria women's national football team on the 20 September 2020 as the captain of the team. She then played against Liechtenstein and Belgium.
