= Betty Low =

Canadian ballet dancer and actress (1916-2016)

Betty Low (1916 – March 12, 2016) was a Canadian ballet dancer and actress born in Ottawa, Ontario, who also performed under the stagename Ludmila Lvova. She is known primarily as a member of the Ballet Russe de Monte-Carlo, and for her film and television acting career spanning several decades in the twentieth-century.

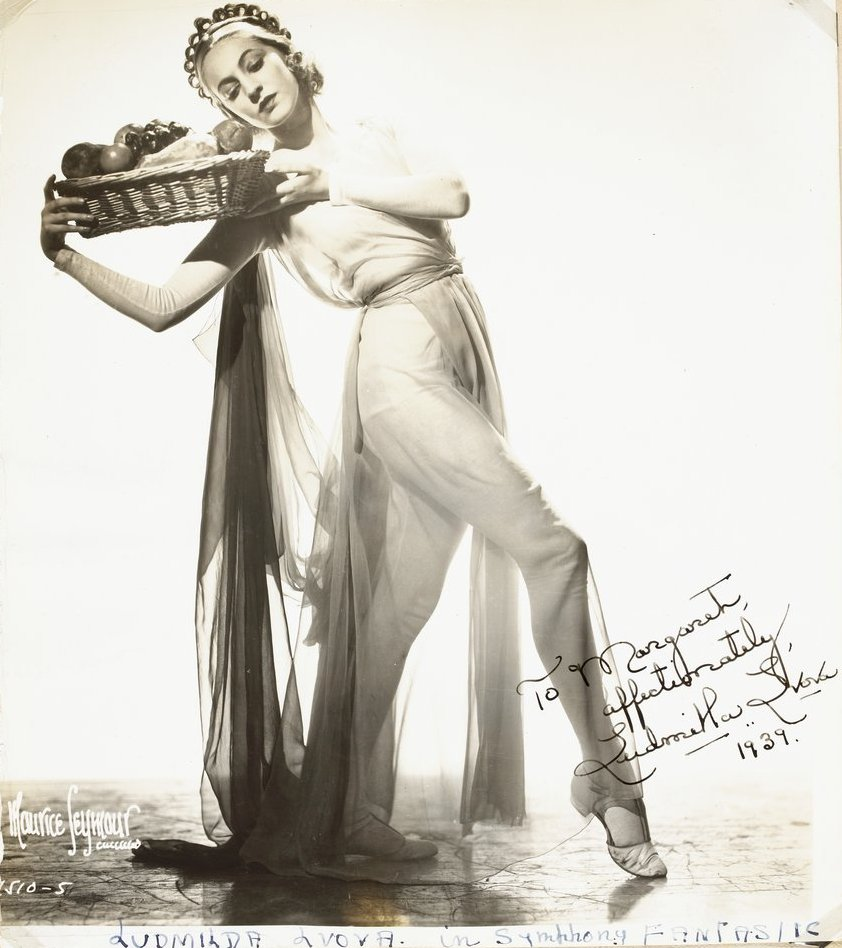
Photograph held by the State Library of Victoria showing Low in costume in Berlioz's Symphonie Fantastique.
