= Bettie Runnels =

American lawyer

Bettie Runnels (October 29, 1871 – January 7, 1943) was an American attorney who was Louisiana's first female lawyer.

She was born in Houston, Texas and moved to Louisiana in childhood. Her grandfather, Hiram Runnels, was the former governor of Mississippi.

Runnels' first exposure to the legal field was working as a stenographer for the law firm Dinkelspiel & Hart. When the state law was revised in 1894 to allow women to study law, medicine and pharmacy, Runnels enrolled as the first female student in the law department of Tulane University in 1897 and graduated a year later. In the same year, Runnels became the first female registered to practice law in Louisiana.

She moved to Illinois, where she worked as a stenographer and court reporter for several decades. She did in 1943 in Maywood, Illinois.

== See also ==
- List of first women lawyers and judges in Louisiana
