= Bety =

Bety is a nickname. Notable people with the name include:

- Bety of Betsimisaraka (1735–1805), queen regnant of the kingdom of Betsimisaraka
- Bety Cariño (died 2010), Mexican human rights activist
- Bety Reis (born 1983), East Timorese actress, director and film producer
