= Betty Jamerson Reed =

American historian

Betty Jamerson Reed (born 1937) is a researcher, author and retired educator in the United States. She has written about school segregation in North Carolina and educators who challenged discrimination.

== Early life and education ==
She is a native of Western North Carolina. She graduated from Bryan College in Dayton, Tennessee. She taught history, English, and Spanish at East Henderson High School, Brevard High School, and Rosman High School and has also been an instructor at Blue Ridge Community College, Mars Hill College, Brevard College, and Western Carolina University.

== Career ==
She surveyed Rosenwald Schools in southwestern North Carolina for the State Archives Department in 2002. Reed authored The Brevard Rosenwald School; Black Education and Community Building in a Southern Appalachian Town, 1920-1966 in 2004. The book generally received praise from reviewers. The Brevard Rosenwald School had also been the subject of her dissertation.

In 2011, she published School Segregation in Western North Carolina, A History, 1860s-1970s. In 2012 she was honored by the American Association of State and Local History for her book. In 2019, Reed published Soldiers in Petticoats. To covers the lives and work of educators Martha Berry, Sophia Sawyer, and Emily Prudden. She also writes poetry, and her work has been included in anthologies. She lives in Transylvania County, North Carolina.

== Selected bibliography ==
- Soldiers in Petticoats. WestBow Press. 2019. ISBN 9781973637424.
- School Segregation in Western North Carolina: A History, 1860s-1970s. McFarland. October 14, 2011. ISBN 9780786487080.
- The Brevard Rosenwald School: Black Education and Community Building in a Southern Appalachian Town, 1920-1966. McFarland. 5 March 2004. ISBN 9780786417438.

=== Articles ===
- "Sequoyah, the Son of a Virginian”, The Virginia Writers Journal. July 2022.

=== Website ===
https://bettyjreed.com/
