= Betty Lalam =

Ugandan teacher

- Born: 1980 (age 45–46); Koro, Amuru District, Uganda
- Occupations: Teacher; Director, Gulu War Affected Training Centre
- Years active: 1995–present
- Known for: Survivor of Lord’s Resistance Army abduction; founder of Gulu War Affected Training Centre
- Notable work: Rehabilitation and vocational training for women and girls affected by war in Northern Uganda

Betty Lalam is a Ugandan teacher and ex-abductee of the Lord's Resistance Army, She is a director for Gulu War Affected Training Center.

== Early life and career ==
In 1994, Lalam, aged 14, was abducted from her home in the former Koro Sub-county, located in Amuru district, northern Uganda by the Lord's Resistance Army.

Lalam's mother never made it the next day, because she was amongst those were butchered inside houses by the Lord's Resistance Army (LRA) rebels on the same day, whereas her father, who was at first forced by the rebels to carry big saucepans of meat, was killed when he complained about being so exhausted from carrying such heavy weights, She went on to witness more killings, torture, rape and all sorts of atrocities at the hands of the LRA. In 1995, Lalam got her lifetime chance to escape from captivity during an attack by the LRA on to Atiak Trading Centre in Amuru district. She later moved to Kampala to stay with her sister while looking for what to do, Lalam begun selling local brew, so that she could raise enough money to be able to pay for a vocational training course in tailoring and design. Skills that later opened to her to various doors of opportunities.

After the course, she got a job with Gulu Support Children Organization (GUSCO), a community-based organization that worked with World Vision to rehabilitate war returnees and former child soldiers and providing them with psychological and social support. In 2004, She quit her job and begun a tough journey of creating lives of women and girls who returned from captivity, and begun right outside in front of her rented house with five girls that she trained free of charge, using one sewing machine. With time the numbers kept growing.

In 2006, Lalam signed a contract with World Vision to train more than 60 women and girls who had returned from captivity, she used money earned from the World Vision contract to buy land which turned into a home for the Gulu War Affected Training Centre.

In 2008, Lalam's dream became a reality when the South African ambassador to Uganda, Thanduyise Henry Chiliza, pledged to construct a training center with the South African company Eskom. As a result, classroom blocks, dormitories, a computer laboratory were constructed. In 2010, The Gulu War Affected Training Centre was officially opened and since then According to this centre has graduated 4,300 students in various vocational courses in mechanics, hairdressing, tailoring, catering and business management.

== Recognition ==
She was recognized as one of the BBC's 100 women of 2014.

== See also ==
- List of kidnappings
- Lists of solved missing person cases
