= Betty Ethel Naluyima =

Ugandan politician

Betty Esther Naluyima
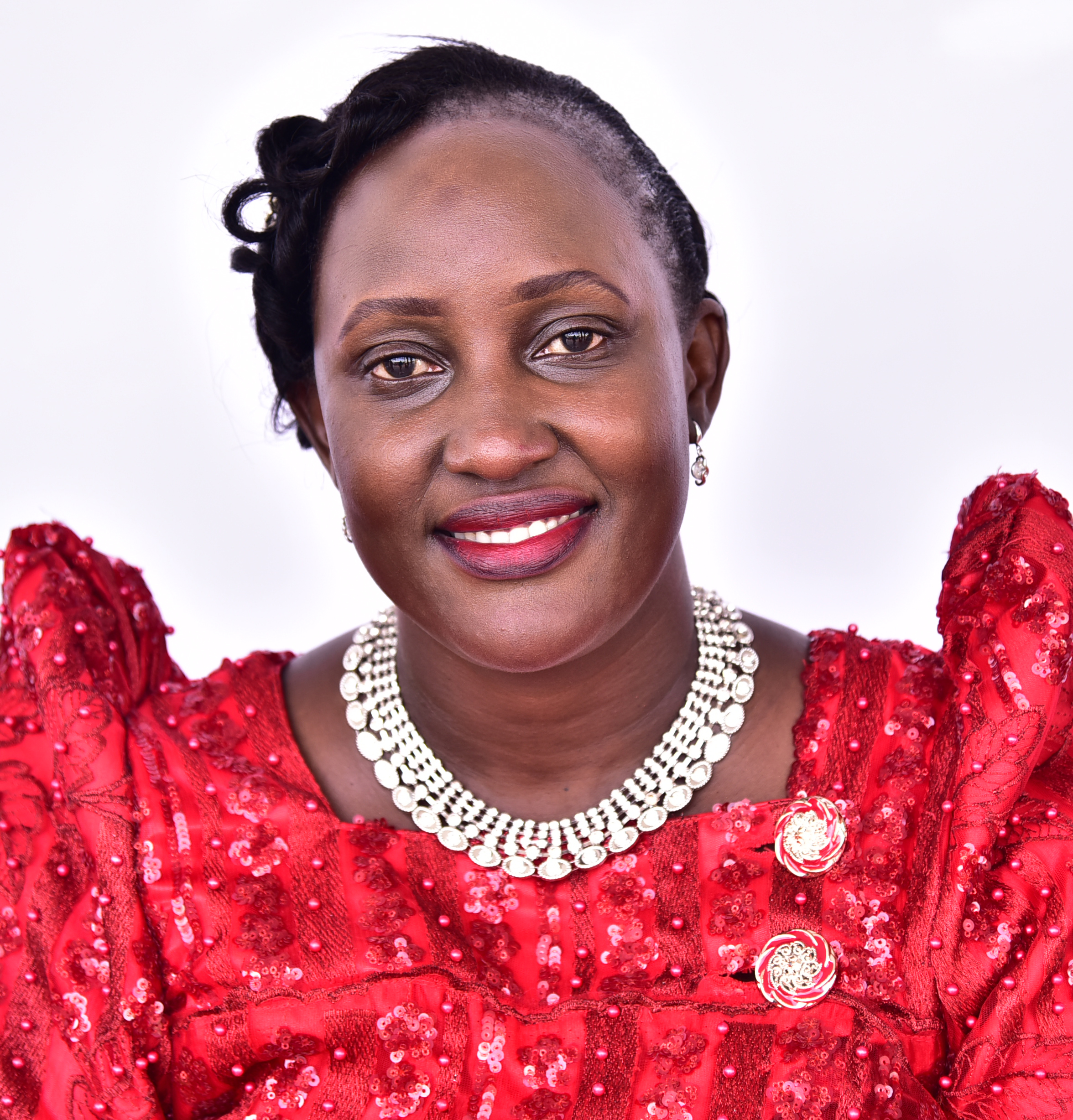
- Born: Wakiso District
- Citizenship: Ugandan
- Education: Kyambogo University; Kampala International University
- Occupation: politician
- Title: Member of parliament
- Political party: National Unity Platform

Betty Esther Naluyima is a Ugandan politician and member of parliament. She was elected in office as a member of the parliament for Wakiso district during the 2021 Uganda general elections. In 2026 Uganda general elections, She was elected as the woman member of Parliament representative in the 12th Parliament of Uganda.

She is a member of the National Unity Platform party.

== See also ==
- List of members of the eleventh Parliament of Uganda
- National Unity Platform
- Wakiso District
- Member of Parliament
- Parliament of Uganda.
