= Betty Groff =

American celebrity chef and cookbook author

- Groff in 1974
- Born: September 8, 1935; Strasburg, Pennsylvania
- Died: November 8, 2015 (aged 80)
- Culinary career
- Cooking style: Pennsylvania Dutch cuisine

Elizabeth "Betty" R. Groff (née Herr, September 14, 1935 – November 8, 2015) was an American celebrity chef, cookbook author, and authority on Pennsylvania Dutch cuisine. Groff authored six cookbooks focusing on Pennsylvania Dutch foods, including Good Earth and Country Cooking, which Time magazine called "one of the top five regional cookbooks introduced in 1981."

In 2015, The Patriot-News further praised her contributions to regional food traditions, writing "Groff was to Pennsylvania Dutch food what the late chef Paul Prudhomme was to Cajun cooking."

== Formative years ==
Groff was born in Strasburg, Pennsylvania, to Clarence Newton Herr (1905-1990) and Bertha Kreider Root Herr (1908-1977). She was a 10th generation Pennsylvania Mennonite and a direct descendant of Swiss Brethren bishop Hans Herr. She married her husband, Abram Bomberger Groff, on November 12, 1955.

== Career ==
In November 2014, The New York Times selected Groff's recipe for glazed bacon to represent Pennsylvania in a survey of Thanksgiving foods from all 50 U.S. states.

== Death ==
Betty Groff died at the age of eighty on November 8, 2015.

== Bibliography ==
- (with Diane Williamson Stoneback) Betty Groff Cookbook: Pennsylvania German Recipes, Harrisburg, Pennsylvania, RB Books, 2001 ISBN 9781879441842
- Betty Groff's Pennsylvania Dutch Cookbook, New York, Galahad Books, 1996 ISBN 9780025458017
- Betty Groff's Country Goodness Cookbook (Doubleday, 1981) ISBN 9780385121200
- Betty Groff's Up Home Down Home Cookbook (Pond, 1987) ISBN 9780943395012
- Good Earth and Country Cooking (Stackpole, 1974) ISBN 9780811707374
