= Betty Bausch-Polak =

Dutch Holocaust survivor (1919–2024)

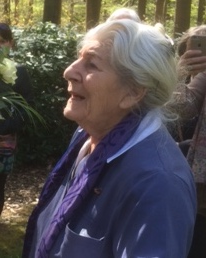
- Born: 4 November 1919; Amsterdam, Netherlands
- Died: 8 November 2024 (aged 105)
- Occupations: Holocaust survivor and Resistance member

Betty Bausch-Polak (4 November 1919 – 8 November 2024) was a Dutch Jewish survivor of the Holocaust and an active member of the Dutch Resistance. She traveled internationally to deliver lectures on the perils of racial discrimination and prejudice.

== Early life ==
Bausch-Polak was born into an Orthodox Jewish family in Amsterdam, on 4 November 1919. From a young age, she recognized the dangers posed by Adolf Hitler and the Nazis and actively protested against them. She aspired to migrate to the Palestine Mandate and therefore undertook agricultural training. In 1939, she married Philip de Leeuw, a Jewish economist who was serving as a section commander of a border battalion in Dinxperlo at the time.

== World War II ==
At an early age, she recognized the threat posed by Adolf Hitler and actively opposed it. During World War II, the Bausch-Polak and her husband unsuccessfully attempted to escape to England by ship. Subsequently, De Leeuw was executed in retaliation. Her parents, in-laws, and sister perished in different concentration camps.

== Legacy and death ==
In 2010, Bausch-Polak began to appear as a guest lecturer in schools in the Netherlands and in Germany. She also give a lecture series in the United States in 2013. Two years later, she spoke at a meeting for Christians for Israel and former Prime Minister Jan Peter Balkenede. That May, she spoke at the Opwekking event for 20,000 attendees. Also in 2013, she appeared alongside her sister in the documentary Herinneren en Doorgeven.

In November 2015, Bausch-Polak was awarded the Order of Merit of the Federal Republic of Germany. The next year, she was invited to meet with the German president, Joachim Gauck.

Bausch-Polak passed away on 8 November, 2024, at 105 years old.
