= Betty Cameron =

Australian servicewoman (1918–2011)

Corporal Betty Cameron (20 November 1918 - 1 April 2011 ) was an Australian World War II servicewoman and WAAAF activist. Born as Elizabeth Katherine Twynam-Perkins, she was educated at Fort Street Girls' High School, Sydney and obtained her Leaving Certificate. From 1938 to 1940 she was a lady cubmaster.

== Parents ==
Betty's father, who was English, was a doctor in the Indian Army. Both his parents were with the British Government in India. Betty's mother, also English, trained at Trinity College Dublin because at the time it was the only University that accepted women students. Capable of speaking seven languages she travelled to the U.S. and later to Argentina.

Betty's parents married in 1908 and had five children. Her husband served in World War I in France in the Australian Army Medical Corps. He was gassed in Ypres and was totally and permanently incapacitated as a result.

== World War II ==
Betty Cameron joined the Royal Australian Air Force (RAAF) in April 1941. Her other community work included being a member of the Mothers' Union of Australia and a voluntary driver at Concord Hospital.

In the WAAAF, Cameron was trained as a wireless telegraph operator. She then served in the Shipping Movement Branch of the RAAF before being transferred to Melbourne. Early in 1942 she was stationed at Parkes to complete a navigation course (theory only) and was then posted to Fighter Section in Sydney. Here she worked underground in the tunnels made for the Eastern Suburbs Railway. Promoted to corporal in May 1942, Cameron went to Melbourne on an officers course and then on the operations course. After completion she was posted to Eastern Area, Point Piper in the Operations Room and Intelligence.

== Marriage ==
Betty Twynam-Perkins and Leith Cameron married in July 1940. They both joined the Royal Australian Air Force (RAAF) in April 1941. In July 1944 Leith Cameron returned to Australia. He was in Sydney for a brief period before being posted to Darwin and the South East Asia area. That same year Betty became pregnant with her first child and was discharged from the WAAAF on 20 November 1944. She and her husband would go on to have three children.

== WAAAF ==
After the war Betty Cameron joined the WAAAF Wing which later became the WAAAF Branch of the RAAF Association. She has held various positions with the Branch including president, secretary and treasurer, and was the convenor of two national WAAAF reunions. For several years Cameron served on the RAAF Association State Committee and was Matron of Honour four times to the debutantes at the annual RAAF Ball as well as helping to train the debutantes and their partners. In 1978 she was made a life member of the RAAF Association.
