= Betty Gibson =

Canadian educator

Betty Gibson (1911–2001) was a Canadian educator considered by the community to be instrumental in developing and implementing the Mathematics and Language Arts Curriculum in Manitoba. Celebrated as "an exemplary educator", the Betty Gibson School in Brandon, Manitoba was named in her honour.

== Biography ==
Over Gibson's twenty year teaching career (1929-1949) she taught in rural Manitoba, the city of Brandon, Manitoba and South Africa. She served as Principal of Fleming School between 1949 and 1959. At the same time she worked on her Bachelor of Arts at Brandon University, which she completed in 1959. Gibson was a professor at Brandon University between 1956-1975 and served as Assistant Superintendent for the Brandon School Division briefly between 1967 and 1968. In 1981 she authored a children's book, Pride of the Golden Bear. Gibson also penned The Story of Little Quack in 1991.

== Awards ==
- Received Centennial Medal, 1967
- Received J.M. Brown Award, 1974 for contributions to education in Manitoba
- Inducted into Brandon University Wall of Fame on November 14, 2003
