= Betty Mendez Livioco =

Radio host

Betty Mendez Livioco, born Beatriz Mendez on February 18, 1931, in Iriga Camarines Sur, Philippines. Known as "Tita Betty", she was the host of the a popular radio show in the 1950s and 1960s called Tita Betty's Children's Show . The show debuted on November 20, 1949. She also directed radio dramas and managed the radio station, DWAN-AM.

== Biography ==
A graduate of Far Eastern University in Manila where she earned her bachelor's degree in accounting.

In 2004, Tita Betty was diagnosed with liver cancer. On March 27, 2006, at the age of 75, Tita Betty died from liver and colon cancer.

She is survived by her husband, Enrique Livioco, her 5 children Butch Livioco, Bess Livioco, Bee Livioco Villanueva, Roberto-Jose Livioco, and Bingle Livioco, 17 grandchildren, and 2 great-grandchildren.
