= Betty Harper =

American artist and illustrator (born 1946)

- Born: Betty Harper; October 4, 1946 (age 79); Bartow, Florida, United States
- Education: Paris American Academy
- Known for: Painter

Betty Harper (born October 4, 1946) is an American artist and illustrator. Best known as the official artist for Elvis Presley Enterprises, she has drawn over 20,000 images of Elvis Presley. A retrospective of Harper's work, "50+ Years with Elvis," was exhibited at the Musicians Hall of Fame and Museum in 2013.

== Early life/Education ==
Born in Bartow, Florida, Harper moved frequently throughout her childhood due to her father's career in the United States Air Force. At the age of 10, while living in Kansas, Harper took an interest in art. After attending 17 schools in 12 years, Harper graduated from Dreux American High School in Dreux, France and went on to study art at the Paris American Academy.

== Career ==
At the suggestion of The Jordanaires' Ray Walker, Harper moved to Nashville, Tennessee in 1969 to pursue her career as an artist. In 1971, RCA Records commissioned Harper for a piece, a turning point in her career. She has created artwork for album covers by musicians including Loretta Lynn, Jim Reeves, Archie Campbell, and Kitty Wells. Her first commissioned piece of Elvis work was in 1977, the year Elvis died. In 1978, to commemorate the one-year anniversary of his death, the Convention and Visitors Bureau of Memphis erected a billboard across from Graceland featuring Harper's work. From August to October 2012, the Center for Southern Folklore in Memphis displayed "50+ Years with Elvis." From there, the exhibit moved to Tupelo, Mississippi, Presley's birthplace, and then to the Musicians Hall of Fame and Museum where it remains on display.

== Personal ==
Harper currently resides in Nashville. She has five children, four grandchildren and three great-grandchildren.

== Selected books ==
- Newly Discovered Drawings of Elvis (1979) ISBN 0-553-01241-X
- Suddenly and Gently Visions of Elvis (1987) ISBN 0-312-00707-8
- Color My World Elvis (2004) ISBN 0-932117-42-2
