= Betty Paërl =

Dutch trans activist and mathematician (1935–2022)

- Born: 1935; Amsterdam, the Netherlands
- Died: 2022 (aged 86–87)
- Occupations: Activist, university lecturer, writer, dominatrix
- Spouse: Hetty Paërl (married 1947: died 2020)

Betty Paërl (1935 – 2022) was a Dutch mathematician, writer, dominatrix, and transgender rights activist.

== Biography ==
=== Early life and education (1935–1968) ===
Betty Paërl was born in Amsterdam in 1935, and aged 22, she married Hetty Paërl (1931–2020). She pursued an education in mathematics and subsequently earned her PhD in 1968, becoming a university lecturer at the University of Amsterdam.

=== Career before transition (1968–1978) ===
Paërl became increasingly involved in Provo, a Dutch anarchist protest movement. This political activism led her to identify as a communist, a conviction she shared with her wife. The couple served together on the Suriname Committee, an entity established in 1970 to campaign for Suriname's independence from the Netherlands and to show solidarity with the Surinamese people affected by neocolonialism. The committee shared the challenges faced by the former colony by publishing the Suriname Bulletin and informational pamphlets, producing films, and conducting lectures and training sessions.

Paërl authored four books under her former name about this: "Nederlandse Macht in de Derde Wereld" (Dutch Power in the Third World), "Klassenstrijd in Suriname" (Class Struggle in Suriname), and "Nationalisme of Klassenstrijd" (Nationalism or Class Struggle) (1973). She also served as an editor for "De Uitbuiting van Suriname" (The Exploitation of Suriname).

In the aftermath of Suriname's independence in 1975, Paërl critiqued the status quo. She asserted that independence should mark the beginning of decolonisation. She argued that significant foreign companies were exploiting Suriname's resources, and until this practice ceased, the country's independence would remain hollow for its people.

The book Class Struggle in Suriname is about a strike in September 1971 that was meant to improve the social and economic situation of workers in Suriname. The book included a poster by Hetty, then Paërl's wife. It featured a ship as a metaphor for Dutch companies. These works were connected to real political actions and protests in the Netherlands.

Paërl's work focused on class struggle in the Global South after World War II. For their own benefit, Western countries kept the prices of raw materials low, which kept the Global South from making money. In Suriname, where immigrants from her country faced racism and other problems, she also saw how class and race interacted.

=== Career after transition (1978–2022) ===
Between the years 1978 and 1980, Paërl pursued gender transition in the social, legal, and medical areas of life. Paërl has stated that she had been cross-dressing her entire life before she transitioned; however, the desire to fully embody a "feminine persona" did not arise until after she divorced her wife. She also found a newfound enjoyment in sexually charged performances and began going to cabarets in the Rembrandtplein area, where she bought a wig for performances. Her newfound enjoyment led her to experiment with dressing up. She said that working as a sex worker in a brothel gave her a euphoric feeling because it was the first time in her life that she was accepted and approached as a woman on both a sexual and an emotional level. She felt a variety of emotions, some of which were not directly related to the sexual aspect of the experience.

She wrote about sadomasochism, advocated for pornography, and worked to eliminate prejudices regarding transgender people, sex work, and sexual pleasure. She advocated for talks about kinks and dildos, and received national attention for her work on the radio, in newspapers, TV, and journals. For instance, she recognized a connection between BDSM and transgender people and held the belief that investigating these roles through SM could assist in making a decision regarding whether or not to transition. After her contract was not renewed at the University of Amsterdam, she went on to pursue a career as a journalist and dominatrix, while continuing mathematics.

In 1986, she helped raise money for the gay monument in Amsterdam by offering her escort services.

== Selection of works ==
=== Books ===
- Kross M., Megens E., Paërl B., Willems L., eds., 1970. De Uitbuiting van Suriname. Nijmegen: Sun
- Paërl B., 1971. Nederlandse Macht in de Derde Wereld: Een Inventarisatie van Economische Belangen. Amsterdam: Nederlandse Praktijk van Gennep
- Paërl B., 1972. Klassenstrijd in Suriname. Nijmegen: Sun
- Paërl B., 1973. Nationalisme of Klassenstrijd . Leiden: Nesbic-bulletin
- Paërl B., 1980a. Geluidsfilm Handboek. Amsterdam: Focus
- Unbehaun K., 1978. Perfecte Filmtrucs. Tr. Paërl B. Amsterdam: Focus.

=== Journal and newspaper articles ===
- Paërl B., 1984. Betty Paërl over transsexualiteit: de hermafroditische oplossing. Prothese (1984) 20, p. 8-9.
- Paërl B., 1987. Billen. Sek, 17 (1987) 5 (mei), p. 32.
- Paërl B., 1985. Fetisjisme: fetisjistiese aspekten van kleding. Slechte Meiden (1985) 4 (sep), p. 8-11.
- Paërl B., 1980b. Transsexuelen vaak miskend. de Volkskrant, 5 December, p. 13
- Paërl B., 1981. Transsexuelen. De Waarheid, 4 May, p. 6
- Paërl B., 1984a. Een pleidooi voor de werkers in de seksindustrie. De Waarheid, 7 July, p. 4
- Paërl B., 1984b. SM is een vorm van seksuele rebellie: het pervers-feminisme van Pat Califia. Homologie, 6(5), pp. 5–7
- Paërl B., Califia P., Arnone J., 1984. Vrouw-zijn is een maatschappelijke constructie. Prothese, 23 October, pp. 6–7

=== Films ===
- Brokopondo, 1973. Film. Directed by B. Paërl and H. Paërl. NL.
- Mariënburg maakt zich vrij, 1973. Film. Directed by B. Paërl and H. Paërl. NL.
- Rietkappers, 1973. Film. Directed by B. Paërl and H. Paërl. NL.

These films premiered at Cinestud in 1973 in Amsterdam.

=== Translations ===
- Califia P., 1983. Zij imiteren precies de hetero's: spelen met rollen en omkeringen. Tr. Paërl B. Slechte Meiden. (nov), p. 2-7.
- Unbehaun K., 1978. Perfecte Filmtrucs. Tr. Paërl B. Amsterdam: Focus.
