= Betty Glad =

American political scientist

Betty Glad (September 27, 1927– August 2, 2010) was an American political scientist who specialized in the American presidency and American foreign policy. Her first work on Charles Evans Hughes led to a nomination for a Pulitzer Prize.

== Education and career ==
Glad graduated from the University of Utah magna cum laude and Phi Beta Kappa with a Bachelors of Science, and went on to receive her PhD from the University of Chicago in 1962.

She began her teaching career at Mount Holyoke College and Brooklyn College, before becoming the first female Chair of Political Science at the University of Illinois. She would stay at Illinois until 1989, when she took up a post at the University of South Carolina. Glad was one of the first women to earn a PhD in political science and then teach at a PhD-granting institution.

Glad's interests included the areas of political science and political psychology, and she was honored for her lifelong contributions in both subjects through the "Frank D. Goodnow Award" from the American Political Science Association and the "Harold Lasswell Award" from the International Society for Political Psychology.

== Legacy ==
Betty Glad has left behind a written legacy about six presidents of the United States, and other world leaders such as Mikhail Gorbachev, Boris Yeltsin, and Nelson Mandela.

The "Betty Glad Legal Defense Fund" has been established in her name through the Women's Caucus for Political Science to help women battle discrimination and misconduct in the workplace.

== Bibliography ==
- World Affairs Programs in Illinois (1965) OCLC 2665555
- Charles Evens Hughes and the Illusions of Innocence: A Study in American Diplomacy (1966) OCLC 456602
- Jimmy Carter: In Search of the Great White House (1980) ISBN 9780393075274
- Psychological Dimensions of War (1994) OCLC 258751127
- The Russian Transformation: Political, Sociological, and Psychological Aspects. Edited by Glad and Eric Shiraev. (1999) ISBN 9780312215668
- Striking First: The Preventive War Doctrine and the Reshaping of U.S. Foreign Policy. Edited by Glad and Chris Dolan. (2004) ISBN 140396548X
- An Outsider in the White House: Jimmy Carter, His Advisors, and the Making of American Foreign Policy (2009) ISBN 9780801448157
- Key Pittman: The Tragedy of a Senate Insider (2010) ISBN 9780231515658
