= Bettie Freshwater Pool =

American writer, poet, and teacher

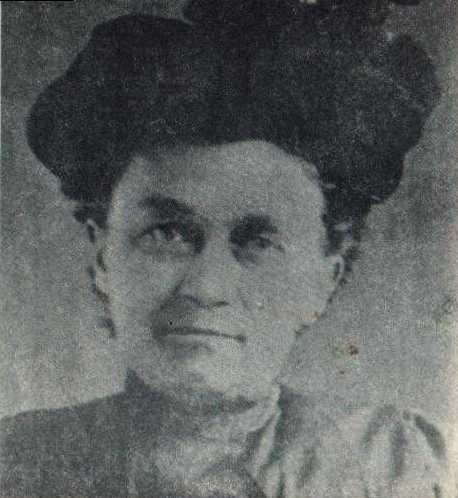
- Born: December 23, 1860
- Died: May 12, 1928 (aged 67)
- Occupation: Writer
- Family: Walter F. Pool

Bettie Freshwater Pool (December 23, 1860 – May 12, 1928) was an American writer, poet, songwriter, and schoolteacher who spent her life in Pasquotank County, North Carolina.

== Life ==
Bettie Freshwater Pool was born on December 23, 1860 at the Pool family plantation near Elizabeth City, North Carolina. She was one of nine children of George Decatur Pool, brother of US Senator John Pool and Solomon Pool, and Elizabeth Fletcher Pool. Her brother was US Congressman Walter Freshwater Pool. While still an infant, she was dropped by a nurse and sustained a spinal injury from which prevented her from attending school outside her home.

Known as a storyteller from her youth within her family, Pool went on to publish four books. The first was a collection of prose and poetry called The Eyrie and Other Southern Stories (1905). It included an account of how her uncle, Dr. William Gaskins Pool, discovered a portrait in 1869 in Nags Head, North Carolina. The "Nag's Head Portrait" is purported to be a portrait of Theodosia Burr Alston, daughter of U.S. Vice President Aaron Burr, whose ship disappeared at sea in 1813. The second was a novel, Under Brazilian Skies (1908), possibly inspired by a relative's trip to Brazil in 1899. Her best known work was Literature in the Albemarle (1915), an anthology of writing from the Albemarle region of North Carolina. A number of the writers included in the work are her relatives, including her brothers Walter Pool and Charles Carroll Pool and several uncles and cousins. Her final book was America's Battle Cry and Other New War Songs Set to Old Familiar Tunes (1918), a collection of songs, with much of the music written by her cousin Lilla Pool Price.

One of her songs, "Carolina, A Song", was published in the North Carolina Booklet in 1909. The same year, a bill was introduced in the North Carolina State Senate to make her work the official state song, though the proposal was not adopted.

Pool supported herself and her sister Patty by opening a school in her home on Dyer Street in Elizabeth City. She died there on May 12, 1928.
