= Betty Rowlands =

English crime writer (1923–2020)

- Born: Kathleen Elizabeth Howard; 6 October 1923; Letchworth Garden City
- Died: 29 July 2020 (aged 96); Bristol, England
- Occupation: Writer
- Relatives: Sir Ebenezer Howard (grandfather)
- Writing career
- Genre: Crime fiction

Betty Rowlands (6 October 1923 – 29 July 2020) was a writer of cosy crime mystery novels set in the Cotswolds and Gloucestershire.

== Personal life ==
Born in Letchworth Garden City, Hertfordshire, to parents Arthur and Kathleen Beatrice Howard (née Brockelbank), her grandfather was Sir Ebenezer Howard, founder of the garden city movement and the first garden city, Letchworth, in 1903. Rowlands had two half brothers from her father's first marriage and the family moved to Bromley, Kent when she was young.

During the Second World War, working at the General Post Office Engineering Department, Betty met her first husband, Bert Jenner and married in 1942. They had three children. They divorced in 1957 and Rowlands married Len Rowlands in 1966, moving to Brimpsfield, Gloucestershire, in 1971.

== Writing career ==
Rowlands began writing seriously when she moved to the Cotswolds and joined local writing groups. At the same time she began teaching adults English as a second language. A number of her early short stories were read on the BBC in the late 1970s and in 1988 she won the Sunday Express / Veuve Clicquot Crime Short Story of the Year Award.

Her first novel was A Little Gentle Sleuthing, published in 1990, when Rowlands was in her late 60s. Her last novel was published in 2014, at the age of 90. She was a member of the Crime Writers' Association.

== Bibliography ==
=== Melissa Craig series ===
1. A Little Gentle Sleuthing (London: Hodder and Stoughton, 1990 ISBN 9780340522332). Republished as Murder at Hawthorn Cottage (Bookouture, 2018 ISBN 9781786816092).
2. Finishing Touch (London: Hodder and Stoughton, 1991). Republished as Murder in the Morning (Bookouture, 2018 ISBN 9781786816597).
3. Over the Edge (Hodder and Stoughton, 1992). Republished as Murder on the Clifftops (Bookouture, 2018 ISBN 9781786816610).
4. Exhaustive Enquiries (Hodder and Stoughton, 1993 ISBN 9780340583203). Republished as Murder at the Manor Hotel (Bookouture, 2018 ISBN 9781786816634).
5. Malice Poetic (Hodder and Stoughton, 1995). Republished as Murder on a Winter Afternoon (Bookouture, 2018 ISBN 9781786817761).
6. Deadly Legacy (Hodder and Stoughton, 1995 ISBN 9780340647295). Republished as Murder in the Orchard (Bookouture, 2019 ISBN 9781786818737).
7. Smiling at Death (Hodder and Stoughton, 1996 ISBN 9780340660478). Republished as Murder at Larkfield Barn (Bookouture, 2019 ISBN 9781786817785).
8. The Cherry Pickers (Hodder and Stoughton, 1998 ISBN 0340708409). Republished as Murder in Langley Woods (Bookouture, 2019 ISBN 9781786817808).
9. The Man at the Window (Hodder and Stoughton, 2000). Republished as Murder at Benbury Brook (Bookouture, 2019 ISBN 9781786817822).
10. The Fourth Suspect (Hodder and Stoughton, 2001 ISBN 9780340750803). Republished as Murder at the Old House (Bookouture, 2019 ISBN 9781786818676).
11. No Laughing Matter (Hodder and Stoughton, 2003 ISBN 9780340826799). Republished as Murder in the Dining Room (Bookouture, 2019 ISBN 9781786818690).
12. Sweet Venom (Hodder and Stoughton, 2004 ISBN 9780340826812). Republished as Murder in a Country Garden (Bookouture, 2019 ISBN 9781786818713).

=== Sukey Reynolds Series ===
1. An Inconsiderate Death (Severn House Publishers, 1997 ISBN 9780727852335). Republished as Death at Hazel House (Bookouture, 2019 ISBN 9781786819871).
2. Death at Dearley Manor (Severn House Publishers, 1998 ISBN 9780727853813). Also (Bookouture, 2019 ISBN 9781786819895).
3. Copycat (Severn House Publishers, 1999 ISBN 9780727854995). Republished as Death at Beacon Cottage (Bookouture, 2019 ISBN 9781786819918).
4. Touch Me Not (Severn House Publishers, 2001 ISBN 9780727856029). Republished as Death at Burwell Farm (Bookouture, 2019 ISBN 9781786819932).
5. Dirty Work (Severn House Publishers, 2003). Republished as Death at Ivy House (Bookouture, 2019 ISBN 9781838880484).
6. Deadly Obsession (Severn House Publishers, 2004). Republished as Death on a Summer Morning (Bookouture, 2019 ISBN 9781838880507).
7. Party to Murder (Severn House Publishers, 2005 ISBN 9780727863041). Republished as Death under the Apple Tree (Bookouture, 2019 ISBN 9781838880569).
8. Alpha, Beta, Gamma... Dead (Severn House Publishers, 2007 ISBN 9780727864673). Republished as Death at The Mariners Hotel (Bookouture, 2019 ISBN 9781838880583).
9. Smokescreen (Severn House Publishers, 2008 ISBN 9780727866691). Republished as Death at the Library (Bookouture, 2019 ISBN 9781838880842).
10. A Fool There Was (Severn House Publishers, 2009). Republished as Death on Clevedon Beach (Bookouture, 2019 ISBN 9781838880866).
11. Miss Minchin Dies (Severn House Publishers, 2010). Republished as Death in the Village (Bookouture, 2019 ISBN 9781838880880).
12. Unnatural Wastage (Severn House Publishers, 2012). Republished as Death as Sycamore House (Bookouture, 2019 ISBN 9781838881894).
13. The Scent of Death (Severn House Publishers, 2014 ISBN 9780727883919). Republished as Death at Sandy Bay (Bookouture, 2019 ISBN 9781838881917).

=== Standalone novels ===
Hive of Bees (Severn House Publishers, 1996 ISBN 9780727851826).
