= Betty Merken =

American painter

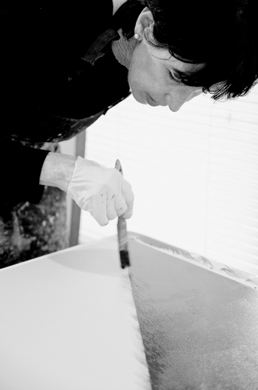
- Website: Official website

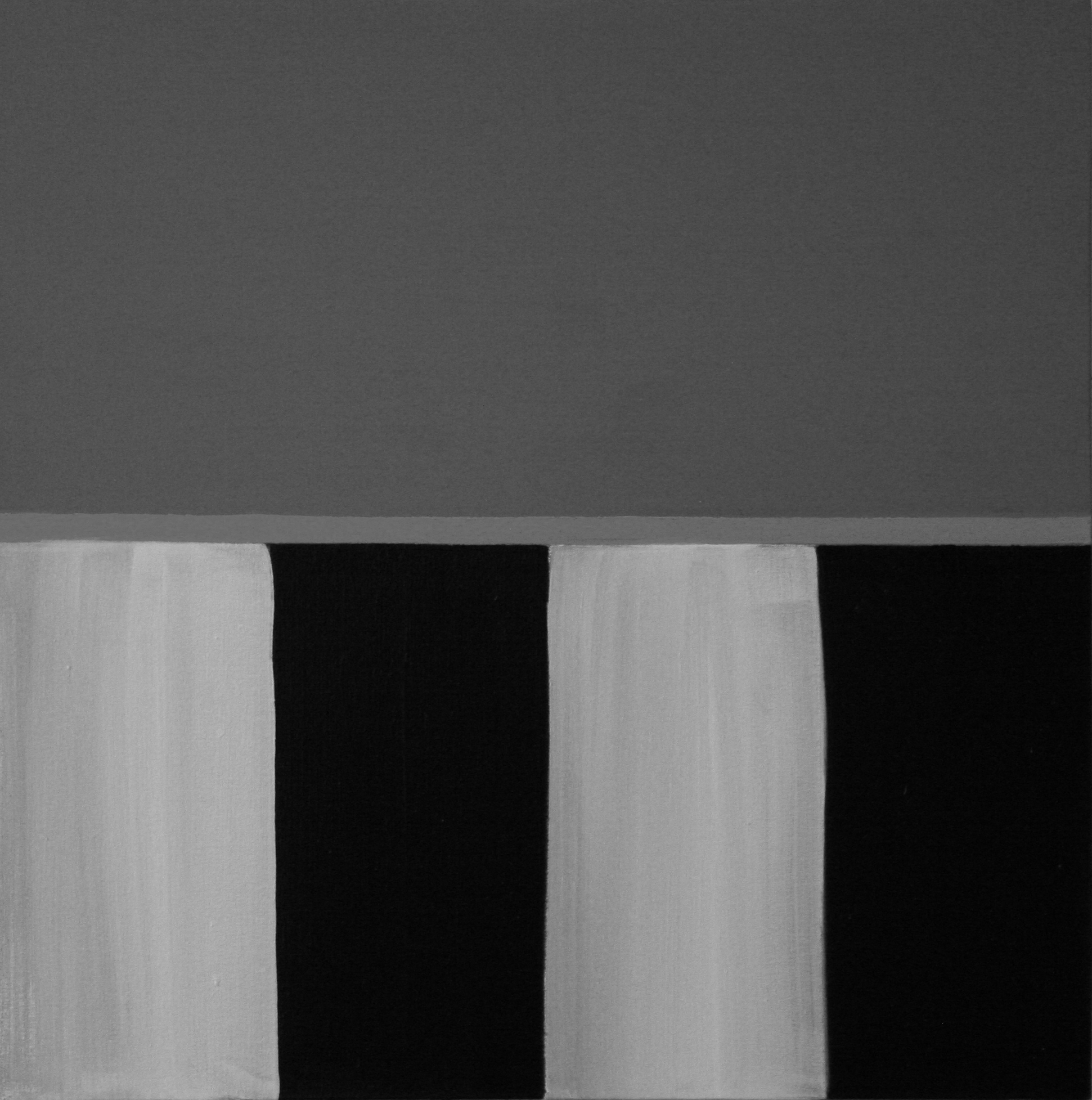
"Homage"

Betty Merken is an American painter and printmaker who lives and works in Seattle, Washington.

Merken's abstract geometric monotypes and paintings recall the early Modernist works of Piet Mondrian and often echo freedoms of painterly gesture pioneered by the Abstract Expressionists.

Her work can be found in several galleries and in numerous private and public collections in the United States, Asia, and Europe, and in the permanent collections of several major museums, including the Fine Arts Museums of San Francisco (The de Young Museum and the California Palace of the Legion of Honor), the UCLA Hammer Museum in Los Angeles, and the Portland Art Museum in Portland, Oregon.

Merken has been honored with fellowships from the BAU Institute in Otranto, Italy and New York, and from the Civita Institute for Architecture and Urban Studies in Italy (formerly Northwest Institute for Architecture and Urban Studies in Italy). She is the co-author, with Stefan Merken, of Wall Art, Megamurals and Supergraphics (Philadelphia: Running Press, 1987).
