= Betty Ladler =

English artist and illustrator

Mary 'Betty' Newmarsh Woolcock
- Born: Mary Ladler; 1914; Hendon, England
- Died: 2004 (aged 89–90); Coombe, United Kingdom
- Known for: Illustration

Mary 'Betty' Newmarsh Woolcock, née Ladler, (1914–2004) was an English artist and illustrator, most notable for her illustrations in books written by Enid Blyton.

== Life, work and death ==
Betty Ladler was born in Hendon, Middlesex in 1914. She joined the Women's Land Army during the Second World War. She was a prolific illustrator predominantly of children's books for the publisher Blackie and Son. Most of her life was spent in England but she travelled extensively and drew images taken from her time in the Middle and Far East and the Swiss Alps. Her home was in the village of Coombe, near Wooton under Edge, South Gloucestershire where she died in 2004.

== Personal life ==
She married John Uglow Woolcock in 1957.

== Exhibitions ==
Ladler exhibited Saloon Bar at the Royal Academy in 1944, Flower Study in 1945 and Flowers in Sunlight in 1947.

== Partial bibliography ==
- The Sound of Pens (written by Ruth Leaver)
- Alison and the Witch's Cave (1956) (written by Shelia Stuart)
- Sally Scatterbrain (1956) (written by Dorita Fairlie Bruce)
- Blackie's Girl School Story Omnibus (1960)
- Study Number Six (1957) (written by Nancy Breary)
- Sally Again (1959) (written by Dorita Fairlie Bruce)
- Flora at Kilroinn (1956) (written by Mabel Esther Allan (1956)
- The Secret of the Silver Bottle (1957) (written by Caleb Hawker)
- Third Holiday Book (1948) (written by Enid Blyton)
- Tenth Holiday Book (1955) (written by Enid Blyton)
- Eleventh Holiday Book (1956) (written by Enid Blyton)
- Enid Blyton's Magazine (1955) (written by Enid Blyton)
- 'Do My Best' Brownie Book (1960) (written by Freda Collins)
- The Hand of the Law (1970) (written by Granville Calland Thornley)
- Morning Light (1957) (written by Stella Mead)
- Collins Girls' Annual (1958)
- The Pearl Book of Girl Guide Stories
- Noel Streatfeild's Ballet Annual (1957) (written by Noel Streatfeild)
- Polly of Primrose Hill (1956) (written by Kathleen O' Farrell)
