= Betty Tyson =

African-American woman wrongfully convicted (1948–2023)

Betty Tyson (née Dove) (June 29, 1948 – August 17, 2023) was a black woman known for her wrongful conviction in the murder of 52-year-old businessman Timothy Haworth in 1973 in Rochester, New York. Tyson, who was 24 at the time of her arrest, spent 25 years in prison, becoming New York State's longest-serving female inmate until her release on May 28, 1998. Her case prompted allegations of police misconduct, coerced testimony, and the exposure of evidence fabrication by a detective, leading to her eventual exoneration. After her release, Tyson struggled financially but was known for her positive transformation in prison, where she found religion, earned a general equivalency diploma, and acquired various vocational skills. She is considered to be a symbol of the potential for miscarriages of justice within the American legal system.
