= Betty Lindberg =

American track and field athlete (1924–2026)

Personal information
- Nationality: American
- Born: September 7, 1924
- Died: June 13, 2026 (aged 101)

Sport
- Country: USA
- Sport: Marathon running

Betty Lindberg (September 7, 1924 – June 13, 2026) was an American masters track and field athlete.

== Career ==
Lindberg began her running career at age 63 and made her debut in the 1989 Peachtree Road Race, and competed in the race annually thereafter. In May 2016, she shattered the world record in the women's 800-meter competition for her age group category at the age of 91 during the Atlanta Track Club's All Comers meet which was held at Emory University.

She took part at the 2019 edition of the USATF Masters Indoor Championships at the age of 94. In February 2022, she competed at the USATF Master's 5K Championships in Atlanta, and went onto set a new world record for the 95–99 age group category. She established an age-group world record with a time of 55 minutes and 48 seconds in the 2022 Atlanta Publix 5K. In February 2023, she completed the USATF Masters 5K Championships in 59 minutes and 6 seconds.

Her participation at the 2024 edition of The Atlanta Journal-Constitution Peachtree Road Race came at the age of 99.

== Personal life and death ==
Lindberg celebrated her 100th birthday on September 7, 2024. She died on June 13, 2026, at the age of 101.
