= Betty Kegakilwe =

South African politician

Betty Kegakilwe MP

Member of the National Assembly of South Africa
- Incumbent
- Assumed office 2024

Personal details
- Other political affiliations: African National Congress

Betty Motebele Kegakilwe is a South African politician who has been a Member of Parliament (MP) for the African National Congress.
