= Lady Betty =

Lady Betty may refer to:

- Lady Elizabeth Hastings (1682–1739), English philanthropist
- Elizabeth Sugrue (c. 1740/1750–1807), Irish executioner
- USS Lady Betty, American naval ship in commission 1917–1918
- Lady Betty (solitaire), a card game

== See also ==
- Wee Lady Betty, 1917 silent film
