= Betts =

Origin
- Language: English
- Meaning: son of Bett (possibly short for Bartholemew, Beatrice or Elizabeth)

Other names
- Variant form: Bett Bettis
- See also: Betz

Betts is an English patronymic surname, deriving from the medieval personal name Bett, a short form of Bartholomew, Beatrice, or Elizabeth. It is also the americanized spelling of German Betz.

== Surname ==
- Abigail Betts (1800–1866), British singer
- Adam Betts (fl. 2007–2024), musician in the band Three Trapped Tigers
- Albert Betts (1888–1924), British gymnast
- Alejandro Betts (1947–2020), Argentine air-traffic controller
- Alexander Betts (political scientist) (born 1980), British political scientist
- Alison Betts (PhD 1986), Scottish archaeologist and academic
- Andrew Betts (born 1977), British basketball player
- Anna Whelan Betts (1873–1959), American illustrator
- Annie Betts (1884–1961), British apiculturist
- Arnie F. Betts (1909–1993), American newspaper editor and politician from Wisconsin
- Arthur Betts (cricketer) (1880–1948), Australian cricketer
- Arthur Betts (footballer, born 1886) (1886–1967), English footballer
- Arthur Betts (footballer, born 1917) (1917–1978), English footballer
- Azor Betts (1740–1809), American physician
- Barrie Betts (1932–2018), British footballer
- Ben Betts (basketball) (born 1968), American basketball coach
- Ben Betts (rugby union) (born 1996), Irish rugby union footballer
- Bert A. Betts (1923–2014), American politician from California
- Beverly R. Betts (1827–1899), American university librarian
- Billy Betts (1864–1941), English footballer
- Blair Betts (born 1980), Canadian ice hockey player
- Charles Betts (born 1986), American wrestler better known as Chad Gable
- Charles M. Betts (1838–1905), American Medal of Honor recipient and Pennsylvania State Representative
- Clive Betts (born 1950), British politician
- Connor Stephen Betts, (c. 1995–2019), American mass murderer, perpetrator of the 2019 Dayton shooting
- Craven Langstroth Betts (1853–1941), Canadian poet and author
- Daisy Betts (born 1982), Australian actress
- Daniel Betts (born 1971), British actor
- Daniel Betts Jr. (1699–1783), American politician
- Darby W. Betts (1912–1998), American Episcopal priest
- Denis Betts (born 1969), English rugby league player and coach
- Dickey Betts (1943–2024), American guitarist, singer and songwriter
- Donald Betts (born 1978), American politician from Kansas
- Doris Betts (1932–2012), American writer
- Duane Betts (born 1978), American guitarist and singer-songwriter
- Eddie Betts (born 1986), Australian rules footballer
- Edward Betts (1815–1872), English railway contractor
- Edward H. Betts (1920–2008), American painter
- Eric Betts (1897–1971), Irish air officer
- Eric Betts (footballer) (1925–1990), English soccer player
- Ernest Beoku-Betts (1895–1957), Sierra Leonean lawyer and politician
- Ethel Franklin Betts (1877–1959), American illustrator
- Francis Betts (1844–1893), New Zealand cricketer
- Frederick Betts (1859–1944), British landowner, donated part of Betts Park in Bromley, London
- Frederick Cronyn Betts (1896–1938), Canadian politician
- Frederick E. Betts (1870–1942), Canadian ice hockey administrator and businessman
- Frederick Nicholson Betts (1906–1973), British Indian Army officer, planter and ornithologist
- George Betts (cricketer, born 1808) (1808–1861), played for Gentlemen and Kent
- George Betts (cricketer, born 1843) (1843–1902), played for Yorkshire
- Gerald Betts (born 1954), Australian rules footballer
- Gilbert Betts (1916–1982), English cricketer
- Gino Betts (fl. from 2006), American attorney and administrator
- Gregory Betts (born 1975), Canadian poet, editor and academic
- Harry Betts (1922–2012), American jazz trombonist and composer
- Harry Betts (baseball) (1881–1946), American baseball pitcher
- Huck Betts (1897–1987), American baseball pitcher
- Jack Betts (1929–2025), American actor
- Jack Betts (journalist), American journalist and columnist
- Jackson Edward Betts (1904–1993), American politician from Ohio
- James Anthony Betts (1897–1980), British artist and academic
- Jean Betts (fl. from 1970), New Zealand playwright
- Jeff Betts (born 1970), American indoor soccer player and coach
- Jim Betts (American football) (born 1949), American football player
- Jim Betts (politician) (born c. 1932), American politician
- Joe Betts-LaCroix (born 1962), American biophysicist and entrepreneur
- John Betts Jr. (1692–1767), American colonial politician from Connecticut
- John Betts (Canadian politician) (born 1949), member of the Legislative Assembly of New Brunswick
- John Betts (Connecticut politician) (1650–1730), American colonial politician
- John Betts (physician) (c.1623–1695), English physician
- John Betts (surgeon and philanthropist) (1799–1875), English medical man
- John Edward Betts (1755–1832), English luthier
- John Felton Betts (1854–1914), merchant and political figure in the Northwest Territories, Canada
- Jonathan Betts (born 1955), British horological scholar
- Jonathan Betts-LaCroix, American business executive
- José Ángel Ramos Betts (2008–2020), Mexican school shooter who committed the Colegio Cervantes shooting
- Joseph Betts (c.1718–c.1766), English mathematician
- Josh Betts (born 1982), American football player
- Kate Betts (born 1964), American fashion journalist
- Katharine Betts (fl. since 1976), Australian sociologist
- Keter Betts (1928–2005), American jazz double bassist
- Kevin Betts (1926–1990), Australian sports administrator
- Kim Betts (born 1971), British gymnast and TV presenter
- Ladell Betts (born 1979), American football player
- Lauren Betts (born 2003), American basketball player
- Lawrence Betts (1904–1984), South African sprinter
- Leah Sarah Betts (1977–1995), English ecstasy-related death
- Lorne Betts (1918–1985), Canadian composer and organist
- Louis Betts (1873–1961), American portrait painter
- Maggie Betts (fl. since 2010), American filmmaker
- Mahlon Betts (1795–1867), American carpenter, shipwright, businessman and banker
- Mathieu Betts (born 1995), Canadian-American football player
- Melvyn Betts (born 1975), English cricketer
- Mike Betts (born 1956), English footballer
- Mookie Betts (born 1992), American baseball player
- Morton Betts (1847–1914), English sportsman
- Naomi Betts (born 1982), American criminal
- Neil Betts (1926–2017), Australian rugby union footballer
- Nelle Marion Betts (1887–1915), Australian cartoonist and illustrator
- Nigel Betts (fl. from 2003), British actor
- Norman Betts (born 1954), Canadian politician and academic
- Peter Betts (fl. since 1963), American figure skater
- Peter Betts (civil servant) (1959–2023), British climate negotiator
- Reginald Dwayne Betts (born c. 1980), American poet
- Richard Betts (priest), Anglican priest of the 17th century
- Richard A. Betts, British climate scientist
- Richard K. Betts (born 1947), American political scientist and international relations scholar
- Robert Betts (born 1981), English football player
- Roland W. Betts (born 1946), American businessman
- Rose Betts (fl. from 2011), English singer-songwriter
- Sally Betts (fl. from 1969), Australian politician
- Samantha Betts (born 1996), Australian cricketer
- Samuel Betts (Connecticut politician) (1660–1733), American politician from Connecticut
- Samuel Betts (1786–1868), American politician and judge from New York
- Selwyn Betts (1879–1938), Australian lawyer and judge
- Sienna Betts (born 2006), American basketball player
- Simon Betts (born 1973), English footballer
- Stanley Betts (1912–2003), British Anglican priest, became Bishop of Maidstone
- Stephen Betts (fl. since 1980), British musician
- Steven Betts (born 1964), British Anglican priest, Archdeacon of Norfolk
- Susan Betts (fl. since 1995), Australian artist and illustrator
- Sylvia Cummins Betts (1909–1969), American film editor
- Tara Betts (fl. from 1999), American poet
- Terry Betts (born 1943), British motorcycle speedway rider
- Thaddeus Betts (1789–1840), American politician from Connecticut
- Thaddeus Betts (physician) (1724–1807), American physician and politician from Connecticut
- Thomas Betts (1650–1717), American colonial politician from Connecticut
- Todd Betts (born 1973), Canadian baseball player
- Tony Betts (born 1953), English footballer
- Torben Betts (born 1968), English playwright and screenwriter
- Whit Betts (born 1950), American politician from Connecticut
- William Betts (MP) (died 1738), English politician
- William Betts (chaplain) (died 1535), English priest, supporter of Anne Boleyn
- William Betts (umpire) (1865–1936), American baseball umpire
- William Vallance Betts (1862–1933), British architect
- Winifred Betts (1894–1971), New Zealand botanist

== See also ==
- Bett (surname)
- Betz (surname)
