= Betts (disambiguation) =

Betts is an English patronymic surname.

Betts may also refer to:

- Betts electrolytic process for separating lead and bismuth
- Betts Group, Australian footwear retailer
- Betts v. Brady, American court case
- R v Betts and Ridley, British court case

== See also ==
- Bets (disambiguation)
- Bette (disambiguation)
- Bett (disambiguation)
- Bettsville, Ohio
