= Palmour Street, A Study of Family Life =

1949 film by George C. Stoney and Bill Clifford

- Directed by: George C. Stoney
- Written by: George C. Stoney
- Release date: 1949
- Running time: 24 minutes
- Country: United States
- Language: English

Palmour Street, A Study of Family Life (1949) (also titled "Palmour Street (1949) | A Black Family in Gainesville, GA") is a short black and white documentary film written, produced and directed by the prolific filmmaker and "father of Public Access Television", George C. Stoney, and his collaborator Bill Clifford. Premiering at the old Fair Street School in Gainesville, Georgia, the film's purpose was to promote the growth of the African American middle class.

With a runtime of 24 minutes, the film was produced in conjunction with the Georgia Department of Public Health, the Hall County, Georgia Health Department and the Southern Educational Film Production Service. The film sits within the Library of Congress and its American Archives of the Factual Film Collection Repository - Motion Picture, Broadcasting And Recorded Sound Division.

Palmour Street stands apart from the majority of 1950 films incorporating African-Americans by portraying an African-American family living a normal life, atypical of the standard racist narratives and stereotypical scenarios of that era.

== Production ==
Film production took place at the unpaved 511 Palmour Street in Gainesville, Georgia in the middle of Gainesville's African American community. No longer in existence, Palmour Street was located between Gainesville's Center Street and College Avenue.

As he also would do with his Georgia production of his All My Babies documentary film in 1953, Stoney partnered with local Hall County, Georgia-based African American physicians, Dr. William Alfred Mason and Dr. Emmett Ethridge Butler, to gain the trust of the black community. Stoney worked closely with the Hall County Health Department to gain trust from the local white community. To gain their trust, Stoney assured the white community that the film would not suggest an unhappy relationship between blacks and whites existed and worked with the local press to publish favorable articles.

The actual residents of 511 Palmour Street, James Wesley Merritt (better known as "Wes Merritt"), his wife Mrs. Mildred Moss Merritt, and their four children, played the role of the fictitious Vernon Rogers family.

== Plot ==
Palmour Street, A Study of Family Life (1949)

The film shows events in the family life of rural African-American families living on Palmour Street in Gainesville, Georgia. It illustrates basic concepts of mental health as they relate to family life and highlights some of the ways that parents influence the mental and emotional development of their children. Also addressed are the challenges for a household in which both parents work outside the home.

Shots include: a health clinic waiting room, people dancing on the front porch, pea-shelling, communal outdoor clothes-washing with washboards and tubs, and other scenes.

== Cast and crew ==
- Wes Merritt - "Vernon Rogers"
- Mildred Merritt - "Mrs. Rogers"
- Shirley Merritt - Rogers' daughter
- James W. Merritt Jr. - Rogers' son
- Randall Merritt - Rogers' son
- Vernon Merritt - Rogers' son
- Unknown Actress - Aunt Esther and the Roger's next-door neighbors
- Unknown Actors - Aunt Esther's Three Children
- Unknown Extras - Neighborhood People
- George C. Stoney - Director, Writer and Producer
- Bill Clifford - Photography
- Rev. William Holmes Borders - Narrator. Longtime Pastor of the famed Wheat Street Baptist Church in Atlanta, Georgia.
- Louis Applebaum - Music
- Phil Bangs - Sound
- William Alfred Mason - Chief Technical Adviser
- Emmett Ethridge Butler, also known as Dr. E.E. Butler, MD - Chief Technical Adviser, and the first African American to practice medicine in Hall County, Georgia.
