= John Betts =

John Betts may refer to:

- John Betts (physician) (c. 1623–1695), physician
- John Betts (Connecticut politician) (1650–1730), member of the House of Representatives of the Colony of Connecticut from Norwalk
- John Betts Jr. (1692–1767), member of the House of Representatives of the Colony of Connecticut from Norwalk
- John Edward Betts (1755–1832), English luthier
- Dr John Betts (surgeon and philanthropist) (1799–1875), founder of The St Peter's Hammersmith Free Schools
- John Betts (Canadian politician) (born 1949), member of the Legislative Assembly of New Brunswick for the riding of Moncton Crescent
- John Felton Betts (1854–1914), merchant and political figure in the Northwest Territories, Canada

== See also ==
- Betts, surname
- Jonathan Betts (born 1955), British horological scholar
- Joe Betts-LaCroix (born 1962), American computer company executive
