= Bette Midler (disambiguation) =

Bette Midler is a U.S artist; an actress, singer, comedienne.

Bette Midler may also refer to:

- Bette Midler (album), a 1973 album by Bette Midler
- Bette (album), a 2000 album by Bette Midler
- The Bette Midler Show, a 1976 video from HBO featuring Bette Midler
- Bette (TV series), a 2000-2001 TV series starring Bette Midler

== See also ==
- The Divine Miss M (1972 album) album by Bette Midler
- Bette (disambiguation)
- Midler (surname)
