= Betz =

Betz may refer to:

- Betz (surname)
- Betz Airport, Michigan
- Betz cell, giant pyramidal neuron of primary motor cortex
- Betz's law, law of physics applying to fluids
- Betz, Oise, commune in France
- GE Betz, water treatment company

== See also ==
- Betts, surname
- Willi Betz, logistics company
