= Margravine Cemetery =

Cemetery in London

Coordinates: 51.48889°N 0.21536°W

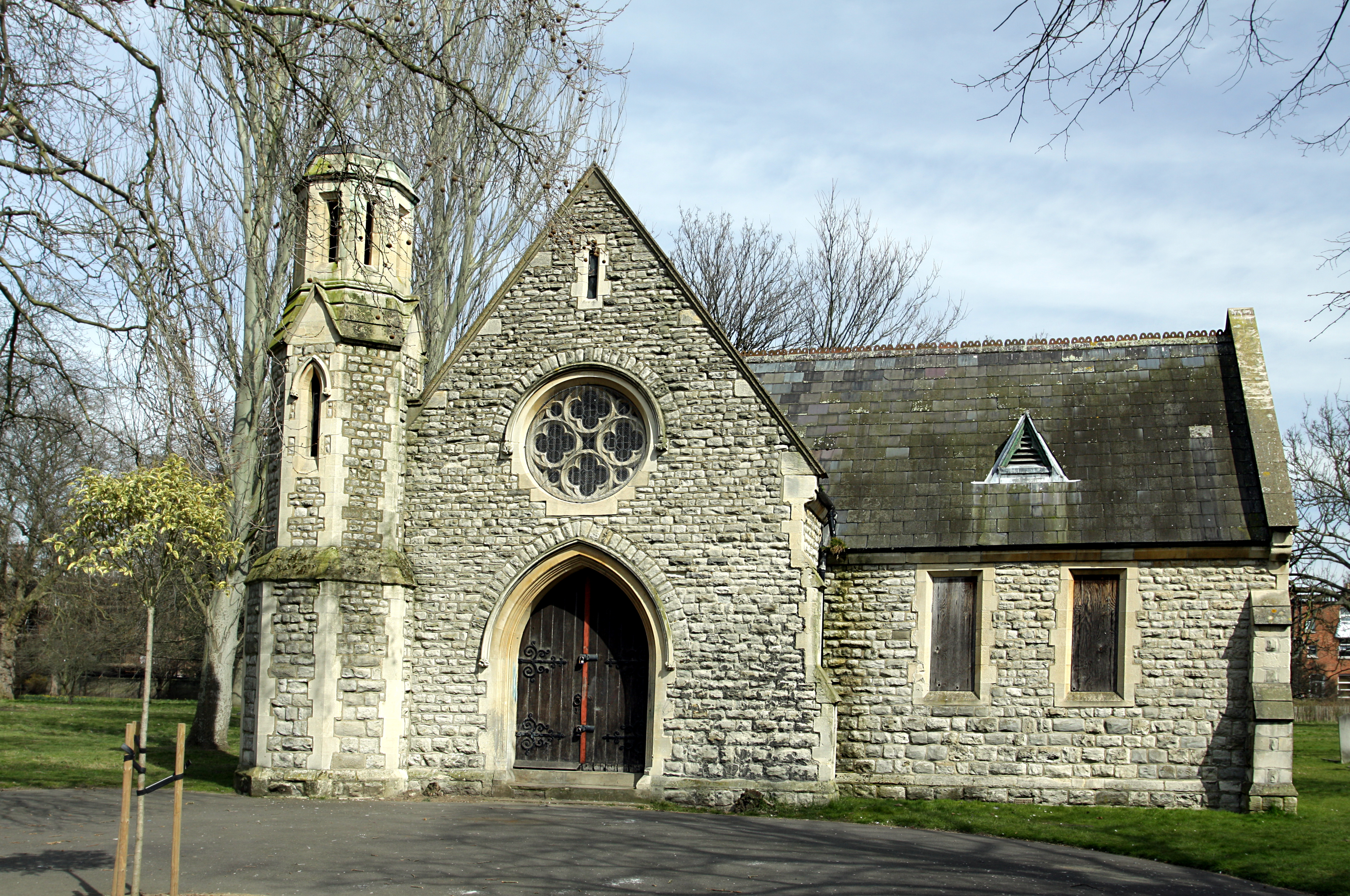
Cemetery chapel

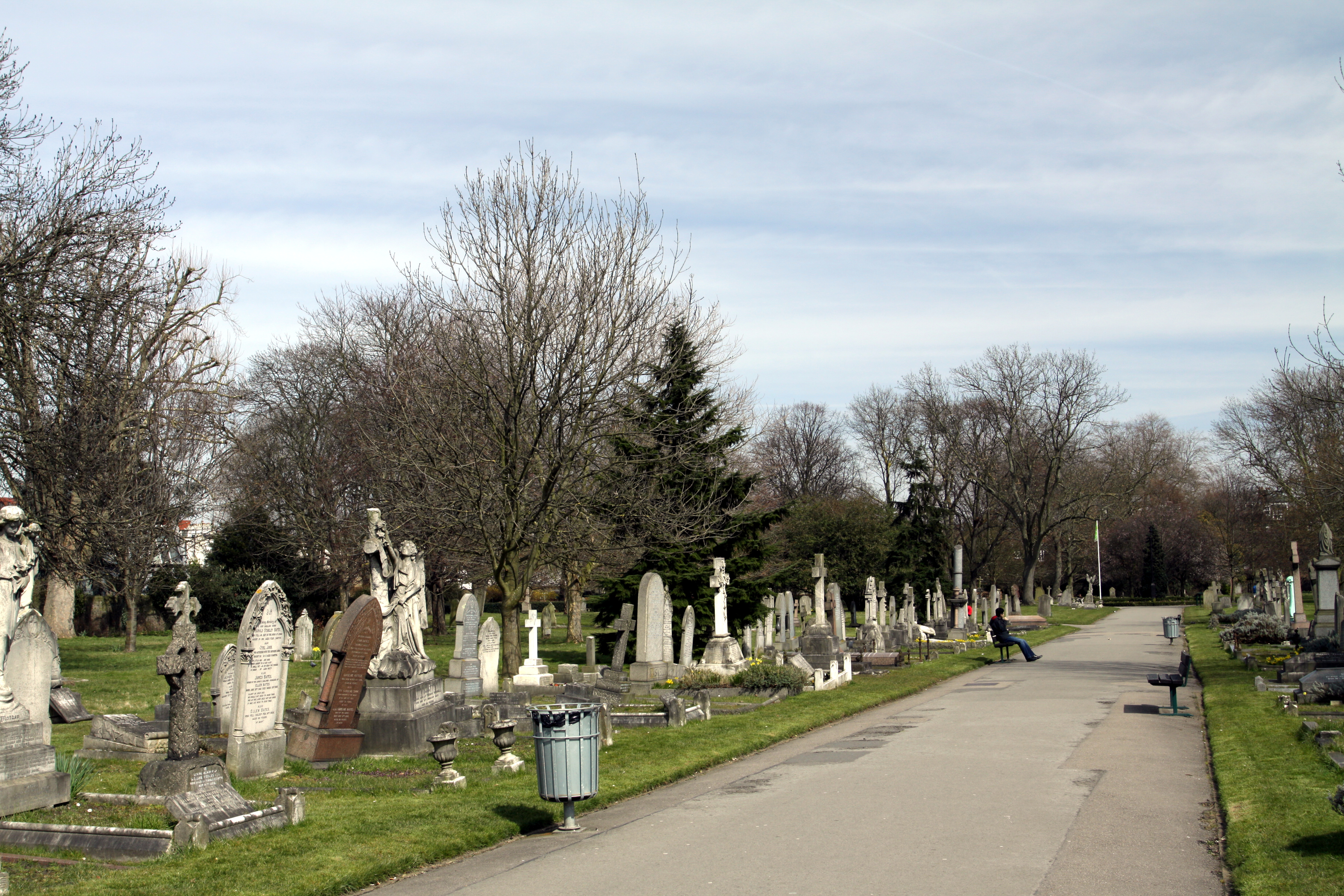
Central pathway through the cemetery

Margravine Cemetery, also known as Hammersmith Cemetery, is in the London Borough of Hammersmith and Fulham. The closest London Underground station is Barons Court.

== History ==
Designed for the Hammersmith Burial Board by local architect George Saunders, Margravine Cemetery was opened in 1868 on a site previously occupied by market gardens and orchards, known as Fulham Fields. The first burial took place on 3 November 1869.

Margravine closed for new burials in 1951, when the 16.5 acres of cemetery land were restored by the council and designated a 'Garden of Rest'.

== Notable burials and monuments ==
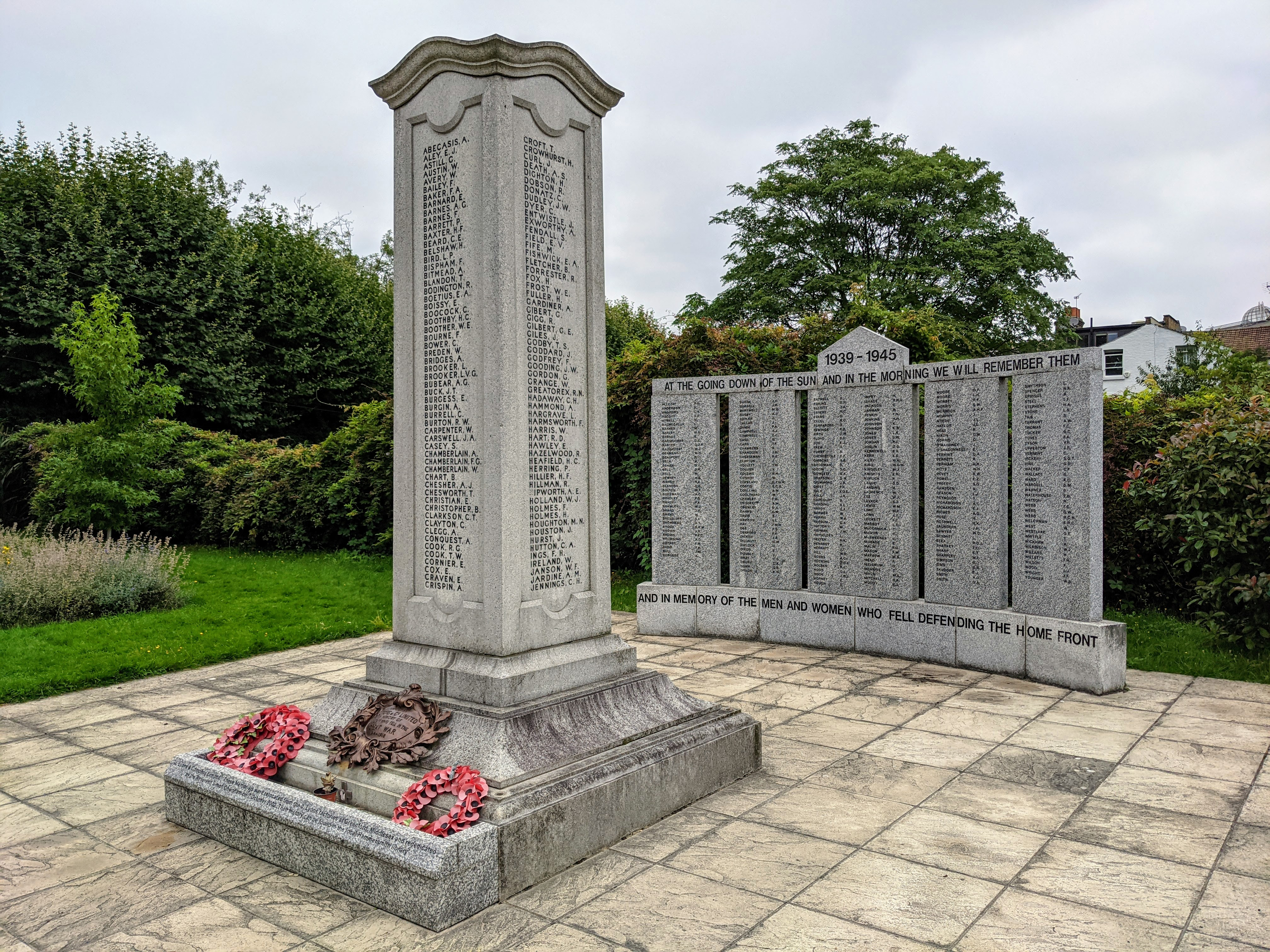
J. Lyons and Co. war memorials

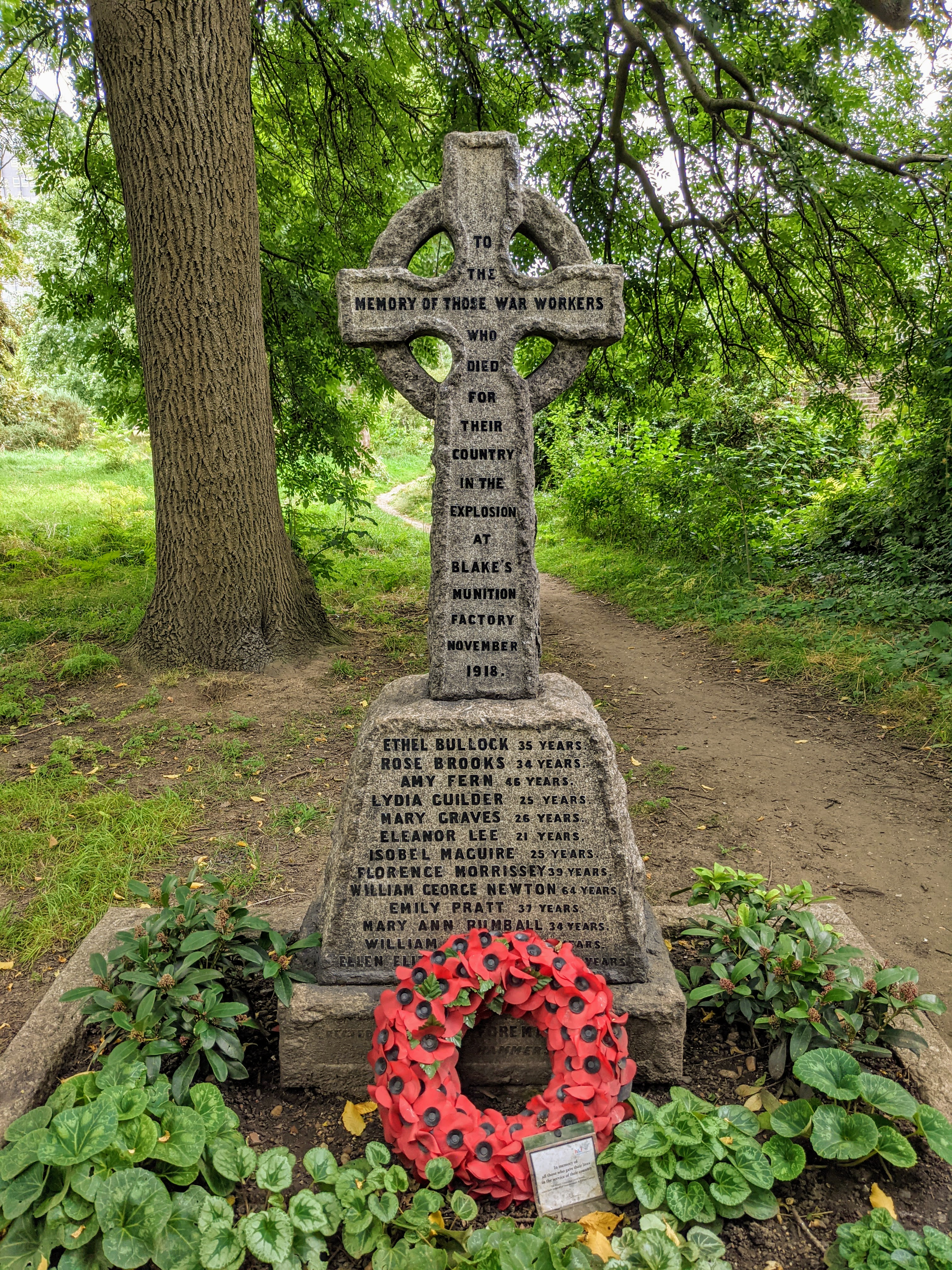
Blake's Munitions Factory memorial

The cemetery contains a number of distinctive monuments, three of which are listed buildings. Most striking is the green bronze memorial to George Broad, who owned the foundry which made the Eros statue at Piccadilly Circus. Nearest Charing Cross Hospital, the Young family mausoleum is a single-storey building in Gothic architecture style. The third listed grave is that of an Australian gold prospector, with a bas relief of him, opposite the Young family mausoleum.

A screen wall memorial erected by the Commonwealth War Graves Commission (who list it as Hammersmith Old Cemetery) in Section 31 lists all 191 Commonwealth service personnel buried in registered war graves in the cemetery – 186 from World War I and 5 from World War II.

Two J. Lyons and Co. war memorials were relocated from their factory at Greenford to the cemetery in 2002. The World War I memorial is Grade II listed.

There is a memorial to the 13 people killed – 11 of them women – in a 1918 explosion at Blake's munitions factory, Wood Lane. It was unveiled in 1920 and Grade II listed in 2017.

=== Notable burials ===
- John Betts (surgeon and philanthropist) (1799–1875), English medical doctor and educational philanthropist
- William Stephen Bond (1845-1920) founder of W S Bond local funeral directors
- George Broad, brass and bronze founder
- Sir William Bull, 1st Baronet, solicitor and Conservative politician
- Jeanne Deroin (1805-1894) Feminist, Socialist and Educationist
- Fanny Eaton (1835-1924), artist's model for the Pre-Raphaelite Brotherhood
- Sir Henry Foreman (1852–1924), Conservative politician
- Peter Leitch (1820–1892), recipient of the Victoria Cross
- Thomas Nicholas (antiquary) (1816–1879), Welsh antiquary and educator
- Ethel Webling (1859-1929) Painter and illustrator
- Peggy Webling (1871-1949) playwright, novelist and poet
- Edward Charles Williams (1807–1881), English landscape painter
- George Wimpey (businessman) (1855–1913), founder of the construction firm of that name

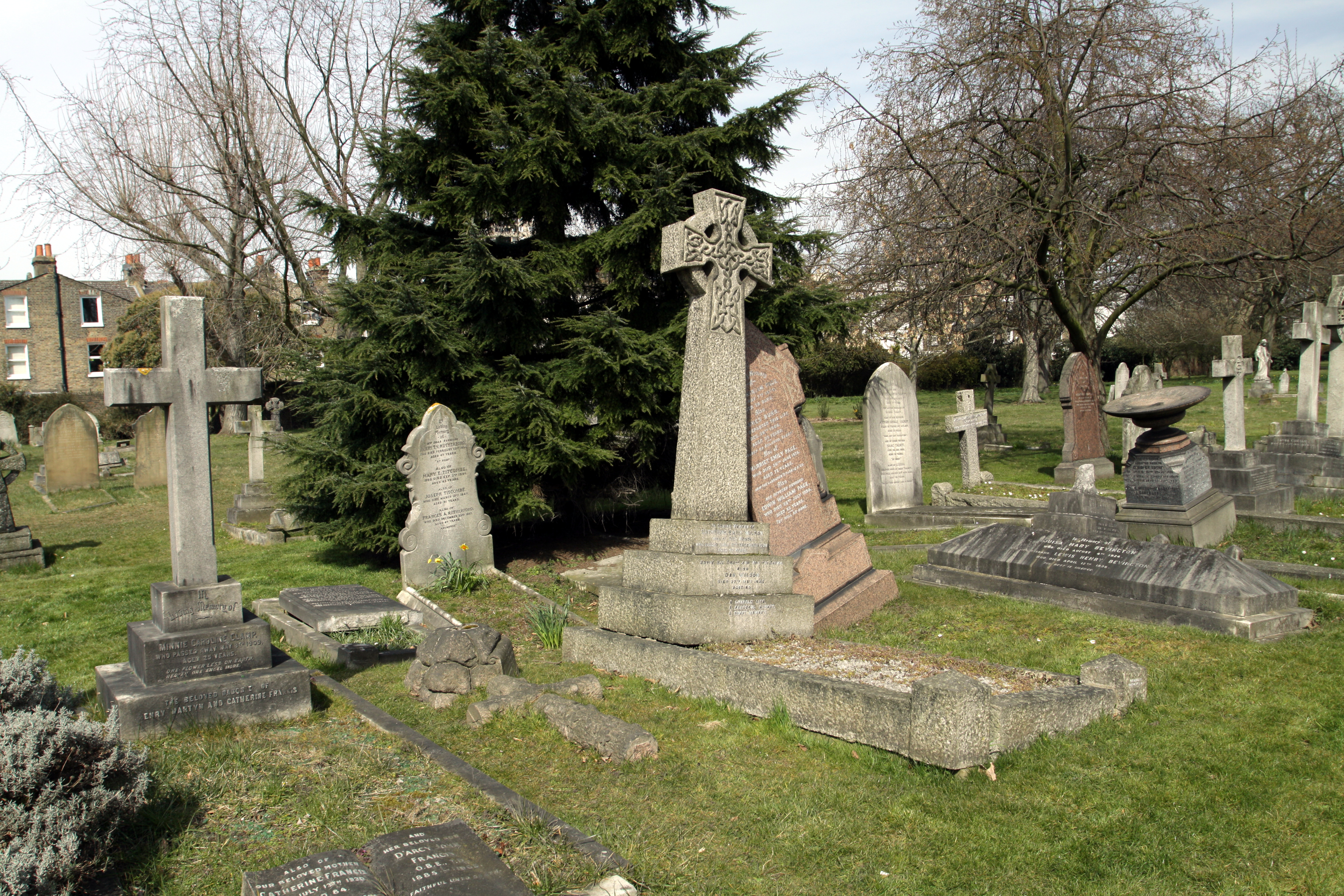
View of the gravestones

== Conservation ==
The cemetery is now a part of the Barons Court Conservation Area, designated in April 1989.

Hammersmith and Fulham council states in its 2008 management plan that the site is designated a Nature Conservation Area of Local Importance. It is a particularly useful space for viewing migrating songbirds, bees and butterflies.

== See also ==
- Mortlake Cemetery, also known as Hammersmith New Cemetery
