= George Betts =

George Betts may refer to:

- George Betts (cricketer, born 1808) (1808–1861), English cricketer with amateur status
- George Betts (cricketer, born 1843) (1843–1902), English first-class cricketer
