= Bettes (surname) =

Bettes is a surname, and may refer to:

- James Whitney Bettes (1848–1925), Canadian merchant and political figure from Ontario
- John Bettes the Elder (fl.c.1531–1570), English artist
- John Bettes the Younger (died 1616), English portrait painter, son of the above
- Mike Bettes (born 1972), American television meteorologist

== See also ==
- Betts
- Bettis
