= Bett =

Bett may refer to:

- BETT, an annual educational trade show held in London
- Bett (surname)
- Bett (slave name), Mum Bett (servant nickname) of Elizabeth Freeman (c.1742-1829)

== See also ==
- Miss Lulu Bett (disambiguation)
- Bette (disambiguation)
- Betts
