= Kibet =

Kibet is a (surname or middle name) of Kenyan origin that may refer to a male born during the day.

- Dan Kibet (born 2004), Ugandan runner
- David Kibet (born 1963), Kenyan middle-distance runner and former Kenyan record holder
- Duncan Kibet (born 1978), Kenyan marathon runner and 2009 Rotterdam Marathon winner
- Eliud Kibet Kirui (born 1975), Kenyan cross country runner
- Elkanah Kibet (born 1983), American long-distance runner
- Hilda Kibet (born 1981), Kenyan long-distance runner representing the Netherlands
- John Kibet Koech (born 1995), Kenyan-born long-distance runner who competes internationally for Bahrain
- Luke Kibet (born 1983), Kenyan marathon runner and 2007 world champion
- Michael Kibet (born 1999), Kenyan middle- and long-distance runner
- Moses Kibet (born 1991), Ugandan middle- and long-distance runner
- Raymond Kibet (born 1996), Kenyan sprinter
- Sammy Kibet Rotich (born 1980), Kenyan marathon runner
- Shedrack Kibet Korir (born 1978), Kenyan middle-distance runner and 2007 World Championships medallist
- Stephen Kosgei Kibet (born 1986), Kenyan half marathon runner
- Sylvia Jebiwott Kibet (born 1984), Kenyan 5000 metres runner and two-time World Championships medallist
- Wilfred Kibet Kigen (born 1975), Kenyan marathon runner and three-time Frankfurt Marathon winner
- Yusuf Kibet Biwott (born 1986), Kenyan 3000 metres runner

== See also ==
- Bett (disambiguation), name origin of Kibet from Kip (meaning "son of") + Bet
- Kibet language, a Maban language of Chad
