= Mary Francis Hill Coley =

American midwife

- Born: August 15, 1900; Baker County, Georgia
- Died: March 8, 1966 (aged 65); Albany, Georgia
- Education: Apprenticed with Onnie Lee Logan
- Years active: 30 year midwifery career
- Known for: providing birth services and starring in All My Babies
- Spouse: Ashley Coley
- Medical career
- Profession: lay midwife

Mary Francis Hill Coley (August 15, 1900 – March 8, 1966) was an American lay midwife who ran a successful business providing a range of birth services and who starred in a critically acclaimed documentary film used to train midwives and doctors. Her competence projected an image of black midwives as the face of an internationally esteemed medical profession, while working within the context of deep social and economic inequality in health care provided to African Americans. Her life story and work exist in the context of Southern granny midwives who served birthing women outside of hospitals.

== Biography ==
Coley was born Mary Francis Hill in Baker County, Georgia. She was the youngest of four children, a sole-surviving twin at birth. She was raised by relatives after her parents died. She received almost nothing in the way of formal education, leaving after third grade but relied instead on practical training and apprenticeship.

In 1930, she married Ashley Coley, a carpenter, and moved with him to Albany, Georgia. He abandoned the family with ten children, and she turned to practical nursing and midwifery under the tutelage of Onnie Lee Logan. Coley was a particular type of lay midwife, often referred to as a "granny-midwife", one who was called to the profession spiritually and who apprenticed under an older midwife. Coley developed a busy practice, serving over half the families in the area and charging double the fees of other midwives ($30). Her business afforded her a home, a car, a telephone, an assistant, and a surplus of ready supplies for emergencies. She knew that many families had to save up to pay her, and she knew which families could afford more or less than others. She would also accept payment in kind in some circumstances.

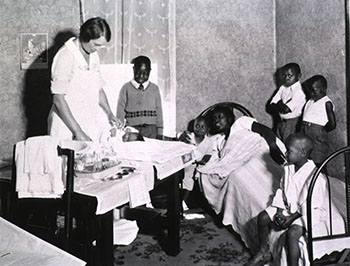
Home visits by nurses such as this one were a critical service funded by the Children's Bureau's Maternity and Infancy program, 1921–1929. (National Library of Medicine)

Coley pursued a career in midwifery at a time of increased scrutiny and regulation (Sheppard-Towner Act or the Promotion of the Welfare and Hygiene of Maternity and Infancy Act of 1921) and during an era when public resources were invested in the expansion of hospitals and obstetric care (Hill-Burton Act of 1946) rather than the midwifery model of care. Although increased surveillance of midwifery practice cut in half the number of midwives between 1930 and 1950 (dropping from 3000 to 1,322), Coley went on to provide a range of birth and family services across Georgia for more than three decades. As an African American, she advocated for the health of Georgia's black population and was known for her willingness to work with women regardless of race in a time of segregation. It is estimated that she delivered over 3,000 babies in her career, and she offered additional services to families such as assistance in cooking, cleaning, child-minding, laundering, and helping new parents file official forms and birth certificates. She was known affectionately by her patients as "Miss Mary".

Coley served as President of the Women's Auxiliary in the Church of the Kingdom of God, and taught Sunday school classes. She died in Albany in March 1966 after a career of over 30 years as a midwife.

== The Use of Midwives ==
Beginning in the 1920s, midwives performed almost half of the births in the United States. The Sheppard-Towner Act, introduced by the Children's Bureau, became effective November 23, 1921 following concerns of high infant mortality. The act regulated hygiene, infancy care and put an emphasis on the licensure of midwives. The Act required nurses to supervise and train midwives. By 1929, the Sheppard-Towner Act was repealed, and the use of midwives had decreased to approximately 10% of births in the United States. More than half of the women using midwives were African American. Black midwives were targeted for lack of cleanliness and lack of training. Many black women were associated with dangerous and ignorance, even while midwives attended classes and were trained on the proper protocols of creating a safe birthing environment. The Hill-Burton Act was introduced and became effective in 1946, it funded the construction of hospitals in areas that mostly used midwives. This shifted many pregnant women to use a hospital instead of at-home birthing methods. The use of hospitals for child delivery increased from 27% to 96% by 1960.

== All My Babies ==
All My Babies (1952). An American documentary film on midwives directed by George C. Stoney.

In 1952 documentary filmmaker George C. Stoney was recruited by the Georgia Health Department to produce an instructional film for midwives in training. Following a criteria-based selection process, Stoney and Dr. Mason (a local black physician) interviewed more than 20 Georgia midwives before selecting Coley. Aware of the social dimensions of media, Stoney initially hesitated to cast Coley because he worried that her screen image could be conflated with contemporary representations of black women on screen, like Hattie McDaniel's Academy Award-winning performance as Mammy in Gone with the Wind. Ultimately, Coley's fit as a model of hygienic clinical practice that could be exported internationally as evidence of the competence of American medicine secured her the role.In her documentary film performance, Coley exhibited multiple layers of credibility—as a mother, as a spiritual leader, and as a science-based health professional.

Over a four-month period, Stoney accompanied Coley as she went about her work of visiting women and delivering babies in the Albany area. Coley not only performed but also collaborated in developing the script. Her sons and three grandchildren performed roles in the film as well. The filming focused on two women (Ida and Marybelle), in circumstances both ideal as well as challenging, and included a live birth scene. He filmed her, her patients and their surroundings, and her interactions with patients and medical professionals. Stoney became impressed with the skill, ingenuity, and high standards for cleanliness that Coley brought to her work, as well as the strong influence she had with her patients and their families.

The resulting film, All My Babies: A Midwife's Own Story followed Coley through the births of two babies. During one of the filmed births, the physician confirms Coley's suspicions of preeclampsia, and the patient chooses to have the doctor perform the delivery. Another scene portrayed the death of one of the newborns delivered by a midwife and all of the ways the midwife had done wrong. Two very different, but likely, interactions demonstrated the midwife to be a qualified form of healthcare but also their limits. All my Babies gained major influence on education for midwives and also training physicians. Medical students were assigned to watch the film in order to immerse them in the birthing experience. As doctors would be working alongside midwives and other forms of skilled birthing attendants, the film introduced the medical students to different forms of care.

All my Babies was used for the training of midwives expanded from Georgia to other parts of the American South and eventually the rest of the world, via UNESCO and the World Health Organization. The film was critically acclaimed as a documentary. In 1953 it was honored with a special Robert J. Flaherty Award for documentary film. In 2002, the Library of Congress selected it for preservation in the National Film Registry, calling it a "landmark". A 1999 retrospective of the work of George Stoney described All My Babies as having made Mary Coley "one of the towering figures of the documentary tradition".

In 2007, Stoney produced a second film about Coley, a reunion of 150 people whom Coley had delivered as a midwife.

== Controversy Surrounding All My Babies ==
Though many health officials used All my Babies as a useful educational tool, some used it as a cautionary tale of second-class health care. Issues arose surrounding the film, emphasizing the mistreatment of Martha Sapp, one of the women who gave birth on screen and the graphic depiction of birth. Many critics addressed the need for setting boundaries for education, as many suggested the scenes were sexually suggestive.

Promoting midwifery was an intolerable concept for health care officials who feared the film would depict the alternative birthing method as the ideal form of delivery. Dr. Martha Eliot, director of Children's Bureau, was an advocate for the film at first viewing. Once seeing the final results, felt the United States may face backlash for the portrayal of an African American woman receiving second-class health care. Thus, a male physician's voice was used to introduce Mary Francis Hill Coley, in order to preserve stakeholder's intentions, without promoting or alienating midwifery to only African Americans.

== Legacy ==
Mary Francis Coley assisted with the birth of over 3,000 babies during her career as a midwife. Coley was featured in the 2005 exhibition "Reclaiming Midwives: Pillars of Community Support" at the Smithsonian's Anacostia Community Museum, and in a traveling photograph and film exhibit entitled, "Reclaiming Midwives: Stills from All My Babies", which ran from November 13, 2006, to April 2, 2007. In 2005 she was also featured in exhibitions at the Columbia University School of Nursing and the Mailman School of Public Health. In 2011 she was inducted onto the list of Georgia Women of Achievement.

== See also ==
- Onnie Lee Logan

== Bibliography ==
Bowdoin, J. P. (1928). The Midwife Problem. Journal of the American Medical Association, 91(7), 460–462.

Fraser, G. (1995). Modern bodies, modern minds: Midwifery and reproductive change in an African American community. Conceiving the new world order: The global politics of reproduction, 42–58.

Fraser, G. J. (1998). African American midwifery in the south. Harvard University Press.

Goode, K. L. N. (2014). Birthing, blackness, and the body: Black midwives and experiential continuities of institutional racism.

Hine, D. C. (1989). Black women in white: Racial conflict and cooperation in the nursing profession, 1890-1950. Bloomington: Indiana University Press.

Hine, D. C. (2011). Taking Care of Bodies, Babies and Business: Black Women Health Professionals in South Carolina, 1895–1954. In Writing Women’s History: A Tribute to Anne Firor Scott (pp. 117–141). University Press of Mississippi.

Holmes, L. J. (1986). African American midwives in the South. The American way of birth, 273–91.

Smith, S. L. (1995). Sick and tired of being sick and tired: Black women's health activism in America, 1890-1950. University of Pennsylvania Press.
