= Bets (disambiguation) =

Bets are gambling wagers.

Bets may also refer to:

- Jogo de bets, a Brazilian bat-and-ball game related to cricket
- Maxim Bets (born 1974), Russian ice hockey player

== See also ==
- Betts, surname
- Betts (disambiguation)
- Bet (disambiguation)
