= William Betts =

William Betts may refer to:

- William Betts (chaplain) (died 1535), supporter of Anne Boleyn
- William Betts (umpire) (1865–1936), baseball umpire
- William Betts (MP) (died 1738), Member of Parliament for Weymouth and Melcombe Regis, 1710, 1713 and 1715–1730
- William Vallance Betts (1862–1933), English architect
- William Betts (1790–1867), English contractor's agent and railway contractor, father of Edward Betts
- Billy Betts (1864–1941), English football player
