= Bete =

Bete or La Bête may refer to:

== People and languages ==
- Bété people of Côte d'Ivoire
  - Bété languages
- Bété syllabary
- Bete people (Nigeria)
  - Bete language (Nigeria), a language of Bete Town, Nigeria
- Bete (priest), the traditional priestly class in Fiji
- Bete Mendes (born 1949), Brazilian actress and politician

== Arts and entertainment ==
- Bete (1986 film), a Kannada-language film by V. Somasekhar
- Bete (2011 film), a Kannada-language film directed by Srinivas Kaushik
- La Bête, a 1991 play by David Hirson
- La Bête (film), a 1975 French erotic fantasy horror film
- Bête, a historical French card game
- Bête (cards), a penalty in certain card games

== Other uses ==
- Beryllium telluride (BeTe)

== See also ==
- Bette (disambiguation)
