= All My Babies =

1953 film by George C. Stoney

- Directed by: George C. Stoney
- Written by: George C. Stoney
- Produced by: George C. Stoney
- Starring: Mary Francis Hill Coley
- Production company: Georgia Department of Public Health
- Distributed by: Columbia University Press
- Release date: 1953
- Country: United States
- Language: English

All My Babies: A Midwife's Own Story is a 1953 educational film written, directed, and produced by George C. Stoney for the Georgia Department of Public Health. The film was intended to educate "granny midwives" in the Southern United States and promote collaboration between traditional midwifery and the modern health system. It follows the work of Mary Francis Hill Coley (1900–66), a prominent African American midwife from Albany, Georgia. Lauded for its groundbreaking depiction of childbirth and midwifery, All My Babies was selected for preservation in the United States National Film Registry in 2002 for its cultural, historical, and aesthetic significance.

== Plot ==
All My Babies follows Mary Francis Hill Coley, also called “Miss Mary,” an African American midwife in Albany, Georgia. It serves as a training tool for "granny midwives," a term applied to African American lay midwives delivering babies in the rural South. The film emphasizes the importance of hygiene and prenatal care. A doctor in the film discusses a case of infant death caused by poor sanitary conditions, reinforcing the need for sterility. Mary Coley exemplifies expert midwifery, guiding two mothers through successful deliveries. One mother has a history of healthy births, while the other, previously affected by miscarriages due to inadequate prenatal care, successfully delivers under Coley's supervision. The film portrays a transitional period in which state legal oversights began phasing out lay midwifery (also called direct-entry midwifery) in favor of regulated medical practices.

== Production ==
George C. Stoney, an early documentary filmmaker,^{[2]} developed an interest in midwifery from his own experiences growing up in the South and through his work as a Southern field representative, where he interacted closely with midwives. ^{[3]} His first collaboration with the Georgia Department of Public Health was Palmour Street, a documentary exploring mental health in Black families. Due to the film's success, the department determined that he was qualified to direct a film about midwives and initially granted him $20,000. The final production cost was $45,000, and filming took place between August 1951 and fall 1952.

To gain the trust of the Black community, Stoney partnered with Dr. William Mason, a local African American physician. At the same time, he also worked to maintain trust with the white community by assuring them the film would not portray Black and White residents as being in direct conflict. He collaborated with local media to secure favorable coverage. ^{[3]} Stoney also gained the support of progressive Black pastor Bishop Noah, who preached to the Church of the Kingdom of God, where Mary Coley, midwife and star of the film, worshipped. Bishop Noah encouraged his congregation not to fear White people, which helped foster a more open and collaborative filming environment, even among an all-white crew [4]. They weren't overly suspicious due to Bishop Noah's direction. While the White film crew and cast had a good working relationship, the film's production wasn't devoid of segregation or bias (racial and north–south) between the White community and cast and the crew and Black cast. The Southern medical establishment was also uneasy with the film's glorification of the midwife's role in the community.

Prior to filming, Stoney followed Coley at her appointments to do field research, having learned from Palmour Street that it is important to meet the Black community where it was at to create an authentic film and not solely rely on information from experts and books. Coley advised on the film as well, helping to plan and structure the film's scenes so they were more realistic to her work. While some scenes were scripted, the film is notable for featuring a 15-minute real-time sequence of a live birth, a technique pioneered by filmmakers. Pare Lorentz and Robert Flaherty. The live-birth scene is silent with narratives of the doctors, Coley, and the chorus creating the joyous music with the babies' cries upon birth being the emphasis. The score, written by Louis Applebaum and performed by the Musical Art Chorus in Washington, D.C., gives the film a sense of joy during childbirth. Coley also sings throughout the film as she cares for mothers.

== Reception ==
The film received public criticism for its explicit depiction of childbirth. However, it was still screened for avant-garde audiences, including Cinema 16 and the inaugural Flaherty Film Seminar in 1953. Despite some viewer discomfort, All My Babies met the Georgia Department of Public Health’s standards for safe birthing practices and was officially approved for use in medical education due to its detailed birth sequence. [1] As a result, public screenings were limited, and the film was mainly shown in private venues, including screenings in New York, to avoid fines or censorship Stoney supported these restrictions, believing they would protect the dignity of the film's subjects while also reinforcing the film's legitimacy as an educational tool.

Internationally, the film was distributed by organizations such as UNESCO, the World Health Organization, and UNICEF. It was used across various countries and incorporated into medical school curricula. Beyond training midwives, the film also sought to improve midwives' status in the eyes of medical professionals, especially in places where cooperation between midwives and physicians was still developing. By showing midwives and doctors working together, the film suggested that the U.S. medical establishment was willing to recognize midwives as important public health workers and could serve as a model for other nations.

== Preservation ==
In 2002, All My Babies was added to the National Film Registry by the Library of Congress as "culturally, historically, or aesthetically significant." Today, the film is studied for its contributions to documentary filmmaking, public health education, and African American history. It has been featured in exhibitions such as "Reclaiming Midwives: Stills from All My Babies" at the Smithsonian Institution's National Museum of African American History and Culture.

Scholars continue to examine the film's nuanced portrayal of midwifery, race, and health care success, and it remains an important artifact for discussions about medical ethics, racial equity, and documentary storytelling.
