= BET 3-wheeler =

1965 Greek car

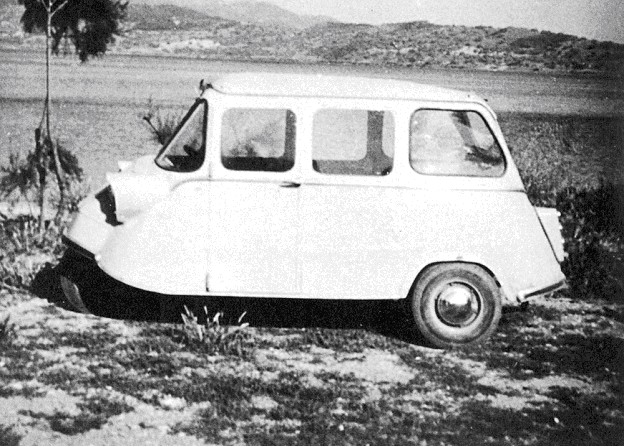
BET 3-wheeler (1965)

The BET 3-wheeler, or BET 125 was a light five-seat passenger car introduced in 1965 by Biotechnia Ellinikon Trikyklon (BET), a small Greek vehicle manufacturer. It used a BMW 125 cc (7.6 cu in) motorcycle engine. Although the type was certified, only one was built due to problems in availability of parts for further production. BET did produce, in small numbers, a number of other three-wheeler types, including trucks and a light passenger car introduced in 1973.
