= BET 500 =

Greek small car

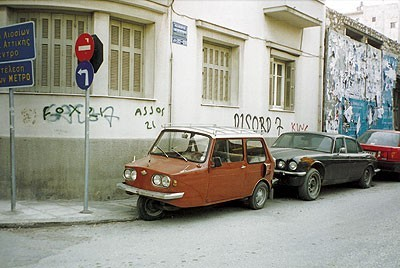
BET 500 (1973)

The BET 500 was light car model developed by BET, a small Greek vehicle manufacturer. Introduced in 1973, it used a Fiat 500cc engine, had a metal body, and seated up to five passengers. It was certified for production and 15 were built and sold, some surviving after at least four decades. Although the car featured good road handling for a 3-wheeler and was roomy for its size, it could find few buyers at these, more prosperous times for Greece, while the company could not secure agreements with banks for favorable loans to potential buyers. Petros Konstantinou, owner of BET, hoped to sell the production rights to other countries; according to him, there were talks with a South African company involving plans for exports or transfer of production to that country, but they were never realized. Another planned version, the BET 600 was not built and the company ceased production altogether in 1975.
