= Onnie Lee Logan =

Alabama midwife

Onnie Lee Logan (née Rodgers) (3 May 1910 – 12 July 1995) was an Alabama midwife and Civil rights activist, who relied on traditional knowledge and who trained lay midwives and served the needs of birthing women in an era when black women were not served equally in the era when hospitals emerged.

== Early life ==
According to an oral autobiography told to Katherine Clark, Onnie Lee was born in 1910 near Sweet Water, Marengo County, Alabama to Len Rodgers (also spelled as Rogers), and Martha Curtis, a midwife and farmer. Her exact date of birth is unknown, but is officially recorded as May 3, 1910. Onnie Lee was named after Jack Maynard's deceased wife--Jack was Martha's employer. It is unclear whether Logan's mother was coerced or not to naming her daughter Onnie.She was the fourteenth child of sixteen. Onnie Lee was herself delivered by a local granny midwife, in part because of a lack of local practicing physicians who would accept black patients, but mainly because black granny midwives had traditionally performed this task since slavery times. In addition to her mother, many members of her family also practiced, including her mother-in-law, both her grandmothers, and one of her brothers-in-law. which was unusual. The prefix "granny" used in front of the term midwife was used to differentiate black midwives from whites, and this title placed limits on Logan's career that would remain with her throughout the entirety of her life, as it automatically and irreversibly placed her in the lower class, regardless of her consistent record of good work as a midwife.

Both her parents were farmers; her father also worked as a carpenter and her mother as a laundress and midwife. Logan took pride of her family's farm. They were able to afford a large house and even an automobile--a notable achievement for this time period as it was uncommon for families, white or black, to be able to afford one. The automobile reflects the wealth status of Logan's family, revealing that they were better off than most black families, and some white families.

Despite being more fortunate than other families, Logan and her family constantly faced racism. In fact, her brothers would often be harassed by members of the Ku Klux Klan. Some of her brothers, were employed under members of the Ku Klux Klan, often calling their black employees "slave labor."

Onnie Lee was 15 years old when she became a maid for a wealthy white family--the same family in which her mother worked as a laundress for.

== Midwifery career ==
Following in a family tradition of midwifery, Onnie Lee Logan's "motherwit," a spiritual calling from God, wove together the practical knowledge from her American Indian and African American heritage. Onnie Lee Logan's career as a practicing midwife went on between 1947 and 1984. Her traditions also relied on magical aid, for example, a knife placed under the mother's bed to help "cut" the pain. At the age of 21, Logan launched her midwifery career while working as a domestic servant in a wealthy white household. She learned midwifery from her mother by attending numerous births and added to that with classroom learning. Logan became licensed by the Board of Health in 1949 and delivered almost every child born between 1931 and 1984 in Prichard and Crighton, the predominantly black areas of Mobile, Alabama. She delivered the babies of both black and white women of Alabama, losing only one baby in her 40 years of practice. She adopted a family-centered approach by encouraging the participation of fathers, understood the birth process as normal, "not a sickness," and relied on relaxation and gravity to facilitate the birthing process. Logan's clients seldom experienced perineal lacerations because she used a combination of breathing, hot compresses, oil, positioning, and encouragement. The first half of her story focuses on what it was like to grow up in a racist society and positions her career narrative within a complex set of race relations in the south. Her book includes positive stories of encouragement from local doctors as well as instances of Klan terror that included the castration of black males and infanticide of mixed-race babies. Alabama outlawed granny midwifery in 1976; Logan was the last granny midwife in Mobile County that was licensed and still practicing when this law was passed. However, the state allowed Logan to continue practicing until 1984 before informing her that her permit would not be renewed and that her services were no longer needed. Logan trained midwives, including Mary Francis Hill Coley.

During Logan's career as a midwife, there were two instances where she was complemented by male doctors on her work. The first occurred in the 1930s when a doctor told Logan that she had the potential to become a great midwife, and the second was in the 1980s when another doctor told her that she would have made a good physician. However, Logan hinted later in her life that she had no interest in gaining such success that it became more important than simply doing the best that she could. Logan specifically stated that she felt she would not have been "no mo' successful being a registered nurse or a doctor," and she felt that her talents were truly God-given. She was passionate about providing help to the rural poor, and going further with her education could have potentially compromised her ability to do so to the extent that she was able to without a higher education. Logan was the last granny midwife in Mobile, Alabama. Although Logan did work in domestic work as a maid and was most widely known for this position rather than a midwife, she considered the work of midwifery to be her "real life's work".

== Autobiography ==
Logan was the author of Motherwit: An Alabama Midwife's Story, as told to Katherine Clark, in the summer of 1984. According to a reviewer in the Georgia Historical Quarterly, The editor of her autobiography foregrounds the voice and circular oral narrative of a black midwife with a life of experience she wants to share rather than take to her grave. The Journal of Nurse-Midwifery noted that the autobiography grants respect to the traditional arts of midwifery.

Logan's life ended on July 11th,1995. Her obituary was published in The New York Times on July 13th, 1995.
