= Bettis =

Bettis is an English surname. Notable people with the surname include:

- Angela Bettis (born 1973), American actress, director and producer
- Chad Bettis (born 1989), American baseball player
- Hilary Bettis, American playwright, actress, producer and writer
- J. Warren Bettis (1924–2011), American jurist
- Jerome Bettis (born 1972), American football player
- Jerrod Bettis, American music producer, composer and musician
- John Bettis (born 1946), American lyricist
- Randy Bettis (born 1959), American DJ and music producer
- Richard A. Bettis (1947–2025), American business theorist
- Tom Bettis (1933–2015), American football player
- Valerie Bettis (1919–1982), American modern dancer and choreographer
- Zachariah Bettis (1816–1879), American politician
