= Peter Leitch (VC) =

Scottish Victoria Cross recipient (1820–92)

- Born: August 1820; Orwell, Kinross-shire, Scotland
- Died: 6 December 1892 (aged 72); Fulham, London
- Burial place: Hammersmith Cemetery
- Military career
- Allegiance: United Kingdom
- Branch: British Army
- Rank: Sergeant-Major
- Units: Royal Engineers
- Conflicts: Crimean War
- Awards: Victoria Cross; Legion of Honour (France)

Peter Leitch VC (August 1820 – 6 December 1892) was a Scottish recipient of the Victoria Cross (VC), the highest and most prestigious award for gallantry in the face of the enemy that can be awarded to British and Commonwealth forces.

== Early life ==
Peter Leitch was brought up in Milnathort, Orwell, Kinross-shire in Scotland, becoming a carpenter and joiner. He enlisted in the Royal Engineers in about 1844–45. After a number of postings, in 1854 he joined the Baltic campaign as one of 106 army sappers who accompanied the Royal Navy fleet. In the Baltic he took part in the Battle of Bomarsund where, as a corporal, he had charge of the carpenters who laid the platform of a British battery landed on Åland Island. Leitch returned to England at the close of the Baltic operations, and was soon sent to the Crimea, arriving early in 1855. Here he took part in the siege of Sebastopol, maintaining the gun platforms of the siege batteries of the British 'right attack'.

== VC action ==
Leitch was a 34 year old colour-sergeant in the Corps of Royal Engineers, British Army during the Crimean War when the following deed took place for which he was awarded the VC.

On 18 June 1855 at Sebastopol, Crimea, Colour-Sergeant Leitch, after approaching the Redan with the leading ladders, formed a caponniere across the ditch as well as a ramp by fearlessly tearing down gabions from the parapet and placing and filling them until he was disabled from wounds.

For his Crimea service, Leitch also received the 5th class of the French Legion of Honour.

== Later career ==
After the Crimean War, Leitch served at Gibraltar before returning to England. Rising to the rank of sergeant major, he finally left the army after 28 years service in the Royal Engineers, of which 17 had been spent abroad. He was then employed in the Royal Engineers office at Dover, Kent, before retiring due to failing health.

He died in London on 6 December 1892 at the age of 72, and was buried in Margravine Cemetery (also known as Hammersmith Cemetery) in West London. Although the grave memorial was lost when much of the cemetery was levelled and cleared during the 1950s, a new headstone was placed on Leitch's grave site by the Victoria Cross Trust in 2016.

Leitch Row, a road in Brompton, Gillingham, Kent is named after him.

== The medal ==
His Victoria Cross and other medals are displayed at the Royal Engineers Museum in Gillingham, Kent.
