= The Bet =

The Bet may refer to:

- The Bet (short story), an 1889 short story by Anton Chekhov
- The Bet (1990 film), a Polish film
- The Bet (1992 film), a short film directed by Ted Demme
- The Bet (1997 film) (French: Le Pari), a French film
- The Bet (2006 film), an Australian film directed by Mark Lee
- The Bet (2016 film), an American comedy film
- "The Bet" (The Amazing World of Gumball), a season 2 episode of the Cartoon Network animated sitcom The Amazing World of Gumball
- "The Bet" (Brooklyn Nine-Nine), a first season episode of Brooklyn Nine-Nine
- "The Bet" (Recess episode), a season 3 episode in the Disney animated television series Recess
- "The Bet", a season 2 (2004) episode of the Nickelodeon television comedy series Drake & Josh
- "The Bet", the second episode of Men Behaving Badly
- "The Bet", an unfilmed episode from Seinfeld season 2

== See also ==
- Bet (disambiguation)
