= George C. Stoney =

American documentary filmmaker, educator, and "father of public-access television

- Born: George Cashel Stoney; July 1, 1916; Winston-Salem, North Carolina, U.S.
- Died: July 12, 2012 (aged 96); New York, New York, U.S.
- Occupations: filmmaker, educator
- Known for: documentary film, public-access television

George Cashel Stoney (July 1, 1916 – July 12, 2012) was an American documentary filmmaker, educator, and the "father of public-access television." Among his films were Palmour Street, A Study of Family Life (1949), All My Babies (1953), How the Myth Was Made (1979) and The Uprising of '34 (1995). All My Babies was entered into the National Film Registry in 2002. Stoney's life and work were the subject of a Festschrift volume of the journal Wide Angle in 1999.

== Early life ==
George Cashel Stoney was born in 1916 in Winston-Salem, North Carolina. He studied English and History at the University of North Carolina and graduated in 1937. Later studying at Balliol College in Oxford, and received a Film in Education Certificate from the University of London. He worked at the Henry Street Settlement House on the Lower East Side of NYC in 1938, as a field research assistant for Gunnar Myrdal and Ralph Bunche's on their publication An American Dilemma: The Negro Problem and Modern Democracy. He was also a publicist for the Farm Security Administration covering the plight of tenant farmers until he was drafted in 1942. Throughout this time he also wrote freelance articles for many newspapers and magazines, including the New York Times, The New Republic, Raleigh News and Observer and the Survey Graphic. He served as a photo intelligence officer in World War II.

== Film career ==
In 1946, Stoney joined the Southern Educational Film Service, writing and directing government education films for their constituents. Shooting in North Carolina, he worked on Mr. Williams Wakes up in 1944, and Tar Heel Family in 1951 under the company. He went on to create films for the Association of Medical Colleges and the North Carolina Film Board. In 1953, Stoney worked with the Association of Medical Colleges to write, direct and produce All My Babies: A Midwife's Own Story. The film follows Mary Francis Hill Coley an African American midwife as she attends to her clients and work with doctors and nurses within the medical establishment to promote education and cooperation within the modern medical field. The film received numerous awards and was inducted into the National Film Registry in 2002 by the Library of Congress. Sylvia Cummins Betts served as the film's editor and frequent collaborator with Stoney on a number of his documentaries.

In the late 1960s, Stoney founded his own production company, George C. Stoney Associates, and taught at Columbia University, Stanford University (1965–67), and became a professor at New York University's Tisch School of the Arts in 1971. He was an emeritus professor at NYU until his death. He directed the Challenge for Change project, a socially active documentary production wing of the National Film Board of Canada from 1968-70. After working with Red Burns on the Challenge for a Change, the pair founded the Alternate Media Center in 1972, which trained citizens in the tools of video production for a brand new medium, Public-access television. An early advocate of democratic media, Stoney is often cited as being the "father of public-access television." With his work in public-access television, Stoney sought to democratize of voices recorded on an audiovisual medium by sharing authority through community engagement.

In 1995, Stoney directed The Uprising of '34 about the General Textile Strike in 1934. For the film's production, over 300 hours of interviews from former mill workers, their children and grandchildren, labor organizers, mill owners, and others who experienced or were affected by the strikes.

== Legacy and Death ==
Stoney was an active member of the Board of Directors for the Manhattan Neighborhood Network (MNN) and the Alliance for Community Media (ACM). Each year, the ACM presents "The George Stoney Award" to an organization or individual who has made an outstanding contribution to championing the growth and experience of humanistic community communications.

He died peacefully at the age of 96 at his home in New York City.

== Filmography ==
- Mr. Williams Wakes Up (1944) Writer
- Feeling All Right! (1948) Writer
- Palmour Street, A Study of Family Life (1949) Writer/Director/Producer
- Tar Heel Family (1951) Writer/Director/Producer
- Land and Life (1949) Writer/Director/Producer
- A Concept of Maternal and Neonatal Care (1950) Director/Producer
- Birthright (1951) Writer
- The American Road (1953) Director
- All My Babies: A Midwife's Own Story (1953) Writer/Director/Producer
- Angels with Silver Wings (1953) Director/Producer
- The Invader (1955) Director
- The Secrets of the Heart (1955)
- The Boy Who Saw Through (1956) Director
- Proud Years (1956) Writer/Director
- Second Chance (1956)
- Hail The Hearty (1956) Producer
- Cerebral Vascular Disease: The Challenge of Management (1959)
- Booked for Safekeeping (1960) Writer/Director
- The Cry for Help (1962)
- The Mask (1963)
- The Newcomers (1963)
- Under Pressure (1964)
- How to Live in a City (1964)
- The Man in the Middle (1966)
- You Are on Indian Land (1969) Producer
- VTR St-Jacques (1969) Producer
- Up Against the System (1969) Producer
- These Are My People... (1969) Producer
- The Prince Edward Island Development Plan, Part 1: Ten Days in September (1969) Producer
- The Prince Edward Island Development Plan, Part 2: Four Days in March (1969) Producer
- Mrs Case (1969) Producer
- A Young Social Worker Speaks Her Mind (1969) Producer
- Occupation (1970) Producer
- Introduction to Labrador (1970) Producer
- I Don't Think It's Meant for Us (1971) Producer
- God Help the Man Who Would Part with His Land (1971) Director
- When I Go. That's It! (1972) Director/Producer
- Hudson Shad (1974)
- Planning for Floods (1974)
- The Shepherd of the Night Flock (1975) Director/Producer
- How the Myth Was Made: A Study of Robert Flaherty's Man of Aran (1978) Director/Producer
- Acupuncture and Herbal Medicine (1978)
- In China Family Planning is No Private Matter (1978)
- The Weavers: Wasn't That a Time (1981) Producer
- Southern Voices: A Composer's Exploration with Sorrel Doris Hays (1985) Director
- How One Painter Sees (1988)
- We Shall Overcome (1989) Producer
- The Uprising of '34 (1995) Director
- Race or Reason: The Bellport Dilemma (2003) Producer
- Flesh in Ecstasy: Gaston Lachaise and the Woman He Loved (2009) Director w David Bagnall
- What's Organic About Organic? (2010) Consulting Producer
