= Bett (surname) =

Bett is a surname. Notable people with the surname include:

- Baldur Bett (born 1980), Icelandic footballer
- Calum Bett (born 1981), Icelandic footballer
- Darren Bett (born 1968), BBC weather forecaster
- Elva Bett (1918 - 2016), New Zealand artist, art historian and art gallery director
- Emmanuel Bett (born 1985), Kenyan long-distance runner
- Franklin Bett (born 1953), Kenyan politician
- Jim Bett (born 1959), Scottish former professional footballer
- Mark Bett (born 1976), Kenyan long-distance runner
- Nicholas Bett (1990–2018), Kenyan hurdler
- Nicholas Kiptanui Bett (born 1996), Kenyan steeplechase runner
- Richard Bett, British philosopher

== See also ==
- Bett (disambiguation)
- Betts
