= Bete (priest) =

Bete were traditional priests in pre-Christian Fijian society who served as intermediaries between people and the ancestral gods, known as kalou-vu. They were responsible for communicating divine wishes, conducting religious ceremonies and interpreting oracles. Their influence extended to political and social affairs, particularly through their relationships with Fijian chiefs. The priesthood was generally hereditary, and Bete held an important position in traditional Fijian religious life.

== Beliefs ==
Every village had a bete, who interpreted omens from the weather and natural world, advised chiefs on war and alliances, and offered healing and guidance in times of crisis. The office was usually hereditary, and every chief had a priest. The bete lived in the bure kalou, or spirit house, which was always the tallest building in a settlement and held ancestor carvings, priests' yaqona dishes, trumpets and oil bowls. A chief or other supplicant brought an offering such as a whale's tooth, a weapon or food.

According to Thomas Williams, the bete sat with his back to a strip of white masi hanging from the roof, the path by which the god was believed to enter him, then fell into a trance that grew from trembling to violent convulsions, and his words were taken as the voice of the god. Chief and priest were often closely linked, one providing temporal leadership and the other spiritual legitimacy, and in Bau and Rewa this pairing was reflected in the titles of the Vunivalu, or war chief, and a spiritual leader. Oral history reported by the Fiji Times says a bete named Tomasi from Navatulevu in Nadi accompanied the exiled Ratu Seru Cakobau to Moala and Matuku as spiritual guardian and counsellor. The bete also play a central part in preparing the vilavilairevo fire-walking ceremony of the men of Beqa.

== See also ==
- Bété
