= Sylvia Cummins Betts =

British-American film editor

Sylvia Cummins Betts (born Sylvia K. Cummins, 1909–1969) was an American film editor, primarily of documentary, educational, and industrial and sponsored films. She was one of the few women editors in this field from the 1940s through the 1970s and was responsible for editing dozens of films with non-theatrical releases.

Betts was originally from England and had worked in the film industry there as an editor on both feature films and World War II newsreels. She directed, produced, and edited a number of short documentaries sponsored during and after the war effort and in involving Britain's colonies. She came to the US after World War II and settled in Georgia, where she worked as a staff editor at the Center for Communicable Disease Control. She later relocated to the Washington, D.C. area and performed editing work under the company name Cummins-Betts located in Glen Echo, Maryland.

Betts collaborated frequently with notable documentary director George Stoney as well as her husband, screenwriter Bill Betts. The collaborations with Stoney included a number of films on medical and public health topics, urbanization, social issues, the military, and religion.

== Filmography ==
- A New Wind (1969) produced for the National Spiritual Assembly of the Baha'i Faith in the U.S.A, directed by George Stoney
- Bold New Approach (1966) about community mental health center, directed by Irving Jacoby
- How to Look at a City (1964) produced by National Educational Television, as part of the series Metropolis: Creator of Destroyer?, directed by George Stoney, featuring Eugene Raskin
- How Things Get Done (1964) produced by National Educational Television, as part of the series Metropolis: Creator of Destroyer?, directed by George Stoney
- Bolivian Boy (196?) about a 10-year-old Aymara boy
- The Fur Lined Foxhole (1964) produced by National Educational Television for Nationwide Insurance Co, directed by George Stoney
- Affairs of State: Food and the Future (1964) produced for North Carolina Film Board about the state's food processing industry
- The Newcomers (1963) produced for the General Board of the Global Ministries of the United Methodist Church about Appalachia, directed by George Stoney
- Heart Research News (1963) produced by the Heart Information about the Center of the National Heart Institute
- The Cry for Help (1962) produced for Louisiana Association for Mental Health and National Institute for Mental Health, directed by George Stoney
- The Devil to Pay (1960) produced for the National Association of Wholesalers, starring Buster Keaton
- To Speak with Friends (1960) produced for the United States Office of Education
- Booked for Safekeeping (1960) made with the Chicago Police Department, directed by George Stoney
- Istala Mashi (1960) produced for UNICEF on combatting typhus in Pakistan
- Second Chance (1959) produced for American Heart Association, directed by George Stoney
- Mission in Bolivia (1959) for United Methodist National Council of Churches
- Heart of a Stranger (1959) for Christian Children's Fund
- From Jack Tars to White Hats (1957-8) for the Office of Armed Forces on the history of the US Navy uniform, directed by George Stoney
- Navy Uniform (195?) for the Office of Armed Forces on the history of the US Navy uniform, directed by George Stoney
- PAL Club (1957) produced for BR Deutschland
- Yung-Cha, Child of Korea (1956) for Christian Children's Fund
- Proud Years (1956) about the Home for the Aged and Infirm Hebrews of New York, directed by George Stoney
- From 5 to 7:30 (195?) produced for the American Temperance Society, directed by Nicholas Reed, cameraman Bert Spielvogel
- The Invader (1955) produced for the Georgia Department of Public Health, directed by George Stoney
- All My Babies: A Midwife's Own Story (1952) produced for Georgia Department of Public Health and the Audio·Visual Division of the Association of American Medical Colleges, directed by George Stoney
- A Concept of Maternal and Neonatal Care (1950) produced for The George Washington University School of Medicine and the University Hospital with the Medical Film Institute and the Association of American Medical Colleges, directed by George Stoney
- The Fire Services at War (1947)
- Indian Background (1946) produced for the British Government's Central Office of Information
- Coal Mining Today
- Critical Harvest (1946) produced for the Ministry of Information
- Defeat Diphtheria (1945)
- Chinese in Britain (1945)
- Fiji Return (1945)
- Report from Burma (1945)
- Round Pegs (1944) produced for Shell Film Unit for the Ministry of Information
- Conquest of a Dry Land (1944) produced for Information Films of India
- Paratroops (194?)
- Royal Observer Corps (194?) for the Ministry of Information
- Breathing Space (1943) for the Ministry of Information
- Down Melody Lane (1943)
- South Africa Marches (1942)
- Royal Australian Navy (1942)
- Indians in Action (1942) produced for the Ministry of Information
- In the Drink (1942-3) produced for the Ministry of Information
- Up With the Lark (1943) comedy starring Gracie West and Ethel Revnell
- The Balloon Goes Up (1942) comedy starring Gracie West and Ethel Revnell
- Essential Jobs (1942)
