= Bet =

A bet is a gambling wager.

Bet or BET may also refer to:

== Arts and entertainment ==
- Bet Lynch, a fictional character from the British ITV soap opera Coronation Street
- Elizabeth "Bet" Yeager, protagonist of Rimrunners, a science fiction novel
- the title character of Bet, Queen of Jordan, a 1924 Dutch film
- "Bet" (song), a 2019 song by Octavian
- "Bet", a song from Aquarius, a 2014 Tinashe album
- Bet (TV series), a 2025 television series for Netflix

== Business and economics ==
- BET, Black Entertainment Television, an American television channel
- Budapest Stock Exchange (in Hungarian Budapesti Értéktőzsde (BÉT))
- BET plc, formerly British Electric Traction
- Biotechnia Ellinikon Trikyklon, a Greek vehicle manufacturer that ceased production in 1975
- Basic Economics Test

== Places ==
- Beaufort railway station, Victoria, station code
- Borkou-Ennedi-Tibesti (prefecture), a former prefecture of Chad
  - Borkou-Ennedi-Tibesti (region), a former region of Chad

== People ==
- Bet van Beeren (1902–1967), renowned bar owner in Amsterdam
- Bet Low (1924–2007), Scottish painter
- Aldo Bet (born 1949), Italian former footballer
- Yelena Bet (born 1976), Belarusian sprint canoer

== Science ==
- BET theory, an adsorption model for gases named after physicists Brunauer, Emmett and Teller
- Blade element theory to determine the behaviour of propellers
- Bromo- and Extra-Terminal domain (BET) family of Bromodomain-containing proteins

== Other uses ==
- Bet (letter), the second letter in many Semitic alphabets, including Phoenician, Hebrew, Syriac, and Arabic
- BET Awards, established in 2001 by Black Entertainment Television
- BET, IATA code for Bethel Airport, Alaska
- BET, National Rail station code for Bethnal Green railway station, London

== See also ==
- Bayt (disambiguation), meaning 'house' in various Semitic languages; part of many place-names
- Bet Bet Creek, Victoria, Australia
- Beth (disambiguation)
- Bets (disambiguation)
- Betty (disambiguation)
- Elizabeth (disambiguation)
- Old Bet (died 1816), the first circus elephant and the second elephant brought to the United States
- Shire of Bet Bet, Victoria, Australia, a local government area
- The Bet (disambiguation)
