= Selwyn Betts =

Australian judge

Selwyn Frederic Betts (6 February 1879 – 14 October 1938) was an Australian judge, recognised as an authority on workers' compensation.

== History ==
Betts was born in Goulburn, New South Wales, a son of Elizabeth Anne Betts, née Tompson and second son of Augustine Matthew Betts, solicitor. He grew up in Goulburn, where his parents had a home "Euthella". He was educated at King's College, Goulburn.

Destined for a life as a lawyer, he served his articles with Pigott and Stinson, and was called to the Bar in 1903. He enlisted with the 3rd Australian Light Horse Regiment in March 1905 and was promoted lieutenant in 1908, and served as an instructor during the Great War, then volunteered for overseas service but when he arrived in London the Armistice had been signed. He was discharged, with the rank of as lieutenant, on 20 January 1920. He returned to civilian life as a barrister, developing an extensive practice in common law, but continued to serve in the armed forces, reaching the rank of lieutenant-colonel.

In 1935 he served briefly as deputy chairman of the Workers' Compensation Commission of New South Wales and in September 1938 was appointed to the Industrial Commission of New South Wales.

He died at his home on Bradley's Head Road, Mosman. His remains were buried at the Gore Hill Cemetery, alongside those of his wife.

He replacement on the Industrial Commission was Judge Henry George Edwards (died 2 July 1952).

== Other interests ==
- Betts was a founding member of Legacy.
- He was a member of the Australasian Pioneers' Club and the Imperial Service Club.
- He was owner of the yacht Whimbrel and a member of the Royal Sydney Yacht Squadron.

== Publications ==
Frederic Seymour Betts and Frank Louat (1928) The Practice of the Supreme Court of New South Wales at Common Law

== Family ==
Betts was a great grandson on his father's side of Rev. Samuel Marsden.

He married children's book illustrator Nelle Marion Rodd on 13 January 1913. They had one child, Peter Selwyn Betts, and she died on 10 October 1915.
