= George Broad =

British brass and bronze founder

George Robert Broad (6 December 1840 - 23 March 1895) was a British brass and bronze founder, a gold and silver carver, and the owner of the Hammersmith Foundry - which cast the Eros Fountain in the centre of London's Piccadilly Circus.

George Robert Broad was born in Kensington, London in 1841, the son of John Broad (born c.1795 in Bedminster, Somerset), a journeyman bricklayer. He started in business as a brass founder in the 1870s, and after his death in 1895, his son George Frederick John Broad (born c.1864, London) took over George Broad and Son.
