= Miss Lulu Bett =

Miss Lulu Bett may refer to:

- Miss Lulu Bett (novel), a novel published in 1920 by American author Zona Gale
- Miss Lulu Bett (film), a 1921 silent film adapted by Clara Beranger and directed by William C. de Mille
- Miss Lulu Bett (play), a 1920 play adapted for stage by Zona Gale
