= Darby W. Betts =

Episcopal priest

Darby Wood Betts (June 5, 1912 August 14, 1998) was an American Episcopal priest who served as canon of the Cathedral of St. John the Divine from 1952 to 1955 during a major national scandal about the use of spanking on boy choristers. In the 1960s he became rector of St. Paul´s Episcopal Church in Oakland and founded Episcopal Retirement Homes, Inc. The Darby Betts Fund was named in his honor.
