= Nelle Rodd =

Australian cartoonist and illustrator

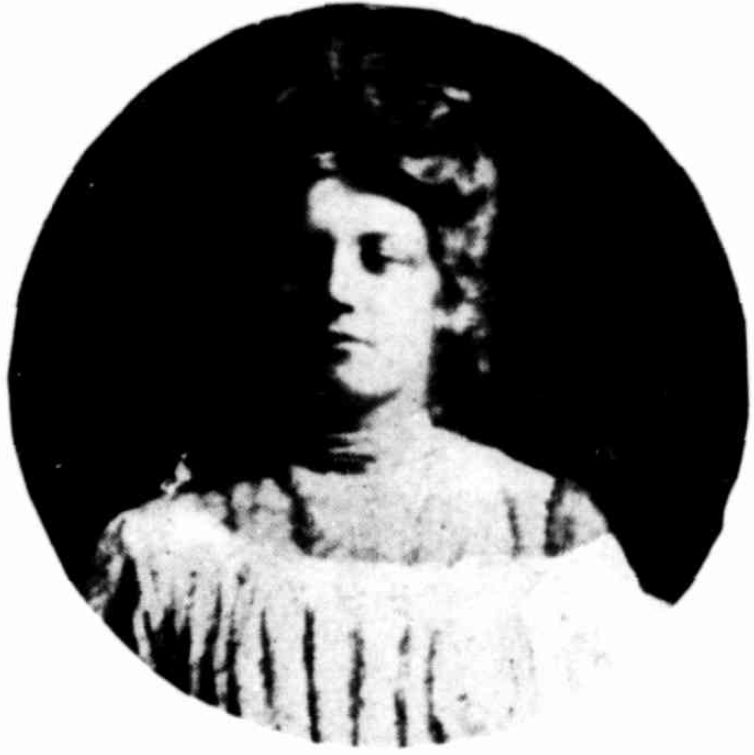
- Born: 1887; Sydney
- Died: 10 October 1915 (aged 27–28)
- Alma mater: Julian Ashton Art School
- Occupation: Painter, cartoonist, children's book illustrator
- Spouse(s): Selwyn Betts

Nelle Marion Rodd (c. 1887 – 10 October 1915) was an Australian cartoonist and illustrator of books for children.

== History ==
Rodd was the eldest daughter of William John Rodd (13 March 1856 – 23 November 1914) and Lissie Marion Rodd, née Robertson. She was educated at Neutral Bay Public School, where she was an outstanding student, excelling in drawing, for which she had been taking extra tuition from a Mr Podmore of Mosman.

She later studied at the Sydney Art School, conducted by Julian Ashton and Syd Long, in whose 1908 exhibition she won numerous prizes and was reviewed appreciatively, particularly her depiction of a domestic quarrel.

She was a member of the Society of Women Painters, of which she was a founding member in 1910. She was an active member of the Society of Artists. and the Society of Women Painters.

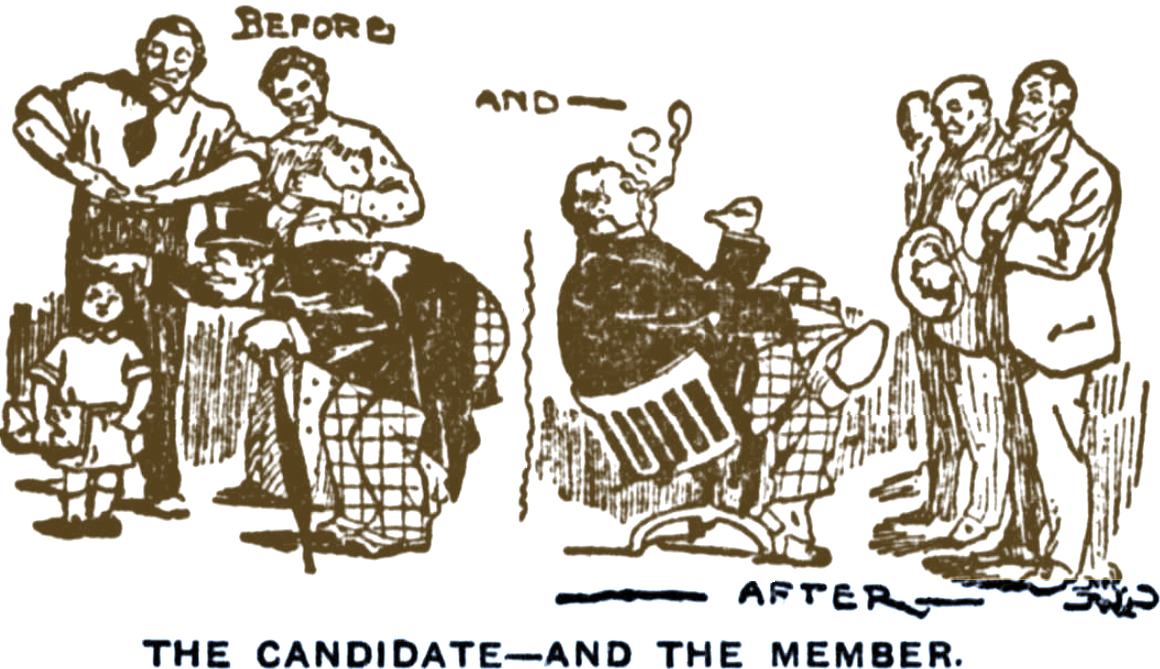

In a 1912 drawing contest organised by the National Art Gallery for prizes contributed by Sir James Fairfax, Rodd's portrait of two young women came second to a study of old men by A. Dattilo Rubbo.

Her watercolor painting of historic Vaucluse House, on display at the Queen Victoria Markets, was the subject of a short article in by a Sydney Morning Herald critic, rating her as "one of our rising Sydney illustrators".

She was for many years the regular political cartoonist for Farmer and Settler, a Sydney newspaper. She illustrated a number of stories for The Sydney Mail from 1912 to 1914.

== Personal ==
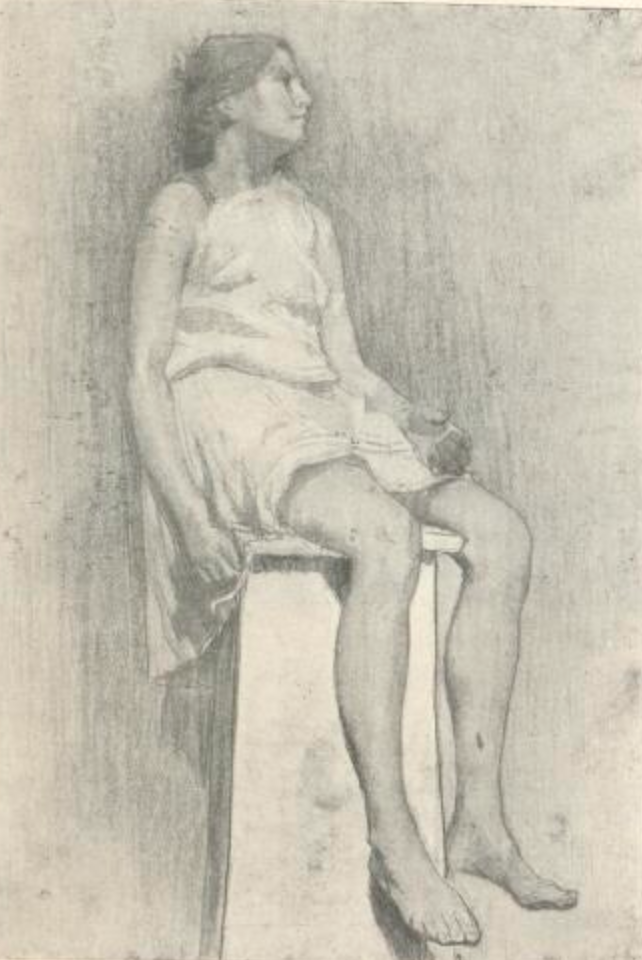
A Costume Study by Nelle Rodd, 1909

On 13 January 1913 she married a young barrister, Selwyn Frederic Betts.

She gave birth to Peter Selwyn Betts on 24 May 1914.

She died on 10 October 1915 at a private hospital in Neutral Bay following an operation for appendicitis and supervening pneumonia.

In March 1916 Selwyn Betts loaned a number of her paintings for an exhibition by members of the Society of Women Painters, but they were definitely not for sale. He never remarried and when he died, at age 59, his grave was alongside hers at Gore Hill Cemetery.

== Publications ==
- Mrs W. A. Holman; illustrations by Nelle Rodd (1918) Little Miss Anzac. The True Story of an Australian Doll, London, T. C. and E. C. Jack, Sydney, Angus and Robertson.
- She painted the catalogue cover for the 1908 Society of Artists exhibition, held by the National Gallery of Australia.
- She illustrated a book of Grimm's Hansel and Gretel, published in England; no further details available.
