= Bété =

Bété may refer to:

- Bété people of Côte d'Ivoire
- Bété language or languages spoken by them
- Bété alphabet
- Bété (fruit), a small citrus fruit grown in southern Nigeria. Closely related to the lime.
