= Betz (surname) =

Betz is a surname. Notable people with the surname include:

- Albert Betz (1885–1968), physicist
- Anton Betz (1893–1984), German journalist and publisher
- Carl Betz (1921–1978), actor
- Claire Betz (1921–2014), part-owner of the Philadelphia Phillies
- Don Betz, university president
- Franz Betz (1835–1900), opera singer
- Georg Betz (1903–1945), military officer
- Gregor Betz (born 1948), swimmer
- Hans Betz (born 1931), rower
- Hans Dieter Betz (born 1931), scholar of religion
- Hans-Dieter Betz (born 1940), physicist
- Hans-Georg Betz, academic
- Jonathan Betz, journalist
- Matthew Betz (1881–1938), actor
- Pauline Betz (1919–2011), tennis player
- Peter Betz (1929–1991), rower
- Vladimir Betz (1834–1894), scientist
- Wim Betz (1943–2019), physician
