= Midler =

Midler is a surname. Notable people with the surname include:

- Bette Midler (born 1945), American singer-songwriter, actress, comedian and film producer
- Lou Midler (1915–1992), American football player
- Mark Midler (1931–2012), Russian Soviet Olympic champion fencer

Fictional characters:

- Midler, character in Stardust Crusaders, the third story arc of the manga series JoJo's Bizarre Adventure
