= Biotechnia Ellinikon Trikyklon =

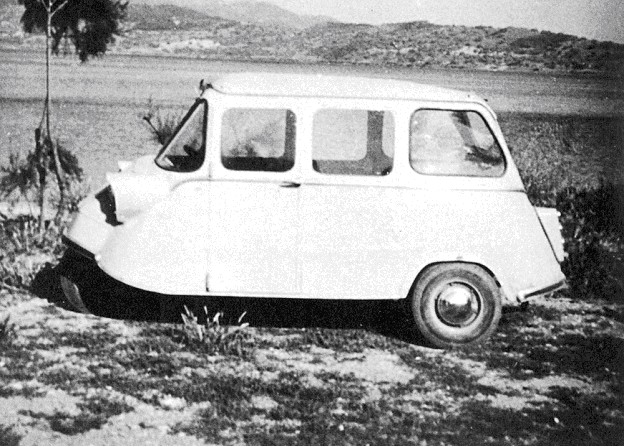
BET 3-wheeler (1965)

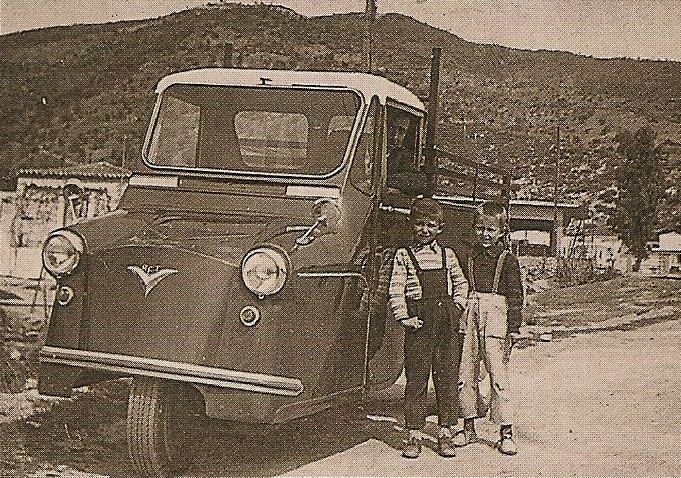
BET 3-wheel truck (1967)

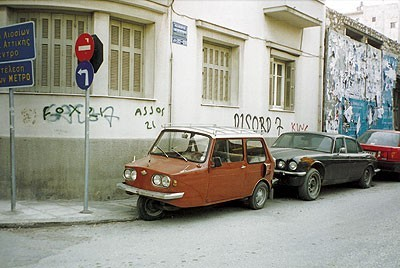
BET 500 (1973)

Biotechnia Ellinikon Trikyklon (Βιοτεχνία Ελληνικών Τρίκυκλων, "Greek Three-Wheeler Manufacturer"), or BET, was a small vehicle manufacturer founded in Athens by Petros Konstantinou. It was one of several manufacturers - the first appearing in the early 1940s - that converted BMW or other motorcycles into light utility three-wheelers. In 1965 it entirely designed and built a small five-seat passenger car with a BMW 125cc motorcycle engine. Although the type was certified, only one was built due to problems in availability of parts for further production. Following this design, three-wheeled truck models were developed and produced. A second passenger car model was designed and introduced in 1973, known as model 500, with a Fiat 500cc engine. With metal body, seating up to five passengers and featuring very good road handling, it was a rather advanced three-wheeler for its time. It was certified for production and 15 were built, some surviving after at least four decades. There were even talks with a South African company involving plans for exports or even transfer of production to that country, but they were never realized. The company ceased production in 1975.

== See also ==
- Reliant Robin: a similar car from the UK
