= Edward H. Betts =

American painter

Edward Howard Betts (August 4, 1920 – May 17, 2008) was an American painter, collagist, author, and teacher. He was known for his abstract paintings which he developed using an improvisational method. He was also an accomplished painter of realistic watercolors. Betts published four instructional books on painting and taught at the University of Illinois.

== Biography ==
Edward Howard Betts was born August 4, 1920, in Yonkers, New York to Harrison and Mildred ( née Waterbury ) Betts.

In 1935, when he was fifteen years old, Betts began taking summer classes at the Art Students League where he studied with George Bridgman, among others. He obtained a degree in art history from Yale University in 1942 and enlisted in the United States Army that same year. After World War II, he was a full-time student at the Art Students League from 1946 to 1948. Betts then entered the University of Illinois where he received an M. F. A. degree in 1952.

In 1949 Betts married fellow artist Jane Burke who he had met at the Art Students League. Jane Betts died in 1984.

Betts taught drawing, composition, and painting at the University of Illinois for 35 years until his retirement in 1984. Beginning in 1973 he taught the "Master Class for Advanced Watercolorists" at Rangemark, the studio founded by Barse Miller near Birch Harbor, Maine.

After his retirement from the University of Illinois, Betts moved to Maine where he married Edis Hatch in 1986. He died in Maine in 2008.

== Art ==
Betts was represented for nearly forty years at the Midtown Galleries in New York City. He also exhibited his paintings at several other galleries around the country.

Betts wrote that he had a "split personality" in that his realistic watercolors were thoroughly planned out in advance whereas his abstract acrylics were developed intuitively with no preconceived idea as to what the final result would be. He wrote that "When I paint, I like to feel that I am working with colors and ideas rather than just making a picture." He has been called a powerful influence and an important figure in experimental art.

Over the course of his life Betts worked in a number of different media including oil, casein, lacquer, gouache, watercolor, and acrylic. He also produced collage and mixed media works.

In February 1983 issue American Artist magazine included Edward Betts in their article THE LIVING LEGENDS OF AMERICAN WATERCOLOR. This article profiled 14 artists who, in their long and distinguished careers, have made significant contributions to the development of American watercolor painting. These artists included: Andrew Wyeth, Dong Kingman, Mario Cooper, Chen Chi, Edgar A. Whitney, Phil Dike, Millard Sheets, Ogden M. Pleissner, John C. Pellew, Donald Teague, Joseph Henninger, Edward Betts, Edmond J. FitzGerald, and Rex Brandt.

== Bibliography ==
=== Books authored by Edward H. Betts ===
- Master Class in Watercolor. New York: Watson-Guptill. 1975.
- Creative Landscape Painting. New York: Watson-Guptill. 1978.
- Creative Seascape Painting. New York: Watson-Guptill. 1981.
- Master Class in Water Media (Revised ed.). Watson-Guptill. 1993. (Updated edition of Master Class in Watercolor with all photographs in full color).

=== Books that include work by Edward H. Betts ===
- Blake, Wendon (1970). Acrylic Watercolor Painting. New York: Watson-Guptill.
- Schink, Christopher (1981). Mastering Color and Design in Watercolor. New York: Watson-Guptill.
- Roukes, Nicholas (1986). Acrylics Bold and New. New York: Watson-Guptill.
- Brommer, Gerald (1986). Watercolor & Collage Workshop. New York: Watson-Guptill.
- Brommer, Gerald (1994). Collage Techniques: A Guide for Artists and Illustrators. Watson-Guptill.
- Schink, Christopher (1995). Color and Light for the Watercolor Painter. New York: Watson-Guptill.
