= Katharine Betts =

Australian sociologist

Katharine Betts is an Australian sociologist specialising in environmental and population issues. She is an Adjunct Associate Professor of Sociology with Swinburne University. She is also a member of The Australian Sociological Association and Sustainable Population Australia.

== Education ==
Betts obtained an undergraduate degree with the University of Tasmania, majoring in English, History and Sociology. Her Honours degree was completed in Monash University. Her thesis explored the relationship between fertility patterns and shift in the accessibility of birth control methods. Betts published several academic articles drawing on this body of research. This includes a statistical exploration of the failure rate of the ovulation method of contraception and its persistence as a supported social policy avenue in the mid-1970s.

Betts then completed a Diploma in Modern Greek at the University of Salonika.

Betts obtained her PhD in Sociology from Monash University. Her thesis was titled Ideology and Immigration Australia 1976 to 1983. This thesis would go on to form the basis of her first authored book published in 1988, Ideology and Immigration: Australia 1976 to 1987.

== Career ==
Betts worked as a sociology lecturer at Monash University from 1981 to 1986, and then became Associate Professor of Sociology with Swinburne from 1987 to 2009, up until her retirement. Betts retains her status as an adjunct professor with Swinburne University in the present day.

Along with Professor Bob Birrell, Betts was co-editor of the quarterly peer-reviewed journal People and Place (1993 to 2010), published by the Centre for Population and Urban Research.

== Research ==
Betts has contributed to three broad areas of Australian sociology: demography and population; environmental sociology; and immigration and citizenship.

=== Demography and population ===
In her early career, in the mid-to-late 1970s, Betts analysed patterns of demography and population in connection to issues of fertility and contraception methods. This included a study of the decline of unwanted births in Victoria as a result of the new-found availability of birth control in 1971. Betts found that within the subsequent four-year period, demographic trends showed that unwanted births declined while the wanted births rate did not.

In this period, the crude birth rate declined from 21.45 births per 1,000 to 16.65 births, and the number of total births had dropped by 13,601(from 75,498 births in 1971 to 61,897 in 1975). At the same time, Betts noted that despite this demographic shift, and in spite of the wider availability of birth control, disadvantaged groups continued to lack access to contraception due to lack of economic and social resources. This put poor people, youth, migrants and unmarried people at higher risk of unwanted births (measured through abortion rates and unwanted births carried to term). Some of the social issues that impacted on the use of new contraceptive methods included the lack of literacy and English-language skills amongst migrant women. Although some pamphlets were made available in a few minority languages, their dissemination was limited, meaning that migrant women were unlikely to understand their contraception options. Data showed that some migrant groups, such as Greek women, were still largely practising the withdrawal method. With respect to single women, a review of survey data on medical practitioners showed that physicians were reticent to prescribe the oral contraceptive pill to young unwed women. Few medical practitioners were willing to provide other methods of contraception other than sterilisation. This was due to their religious beliefs, especially amongst physicians of Catholic background. Betts argued that while fertility and birth control clinics filled in some gaps in the provision of birth control for disadvantaged groups, but they did not meet all their requirements. Betts' contribution to the early literature on contraception in Australia was to show that wider availability of contraception did not necessarily mean equal access. Vulnerable and disadvantaged groups were "ill equipped" to ask for and benefit from new contraceptive methods.

In the late 1970s to mid-1980s, Betts examined the effectiveness of the Billings Ovulation Method of contraception, colloquially known as the ovulation or rhythm method. This technique was established in Australia and grew in popularity around the world. Betts notes that despite the introduction of more effective contraceptive methods in 1971, even in the late 1970s, Government funds and facilities were still promoting the ovulation method of contraception. This method requires that couples only practice safe sex during specific times of a woman's ovulation, and by monitoring a woman's vaginal mucus. Betts notes that this is an inaccurate method that does not adequately safeguard all women from conception, especially women with irregular menstrual cycles. Betts' research shows that Billings and his colleagues had close associations with the Catholic Church, which strongly advocated this method as the sole way to practice contraception. Betts also showed flaws in the original published research that Billings used to establish his methodology, such as with a limited sample of housewives (only 22 women were studied for one menstrual cycle in a follow up report by Billings). Betts also shows that several other studies excluded cases where pregnancy had occurred amongst women using the ovulation method, which significantly skewed the findings, and gave the impression that the Billings method was more successful in preventing unplanned births than was actually the case. Betts also reviews other data that shows that the ovulation method places the onus on women to regulate sexual activity, and therefore ignoring the social context in which sexual activity takes place. For example, studies showed that women were unable to negotiate abstinence from their husbands during specific times. Betts' research calls attention to the way in which the ovulation method became institutionalised in hospitals and birth clinics that received funding from Catholic-affiliated institutions. For example, in 1973-1974, Betts notes that the Family Planning Association received $200,000 of Government funding while Catholic family planning agencies received $100,000. In the late 1970s, Betts notes that half of pregnancies were still unplanned. Under these circumstances, Betts argued that Governments should promote methods of contraception that were more reliable.

Betts returned to this subject in the mid-1980s. She notes that the Billings Method had come under significant criticism, including being the subject of an inquiry by the Royal Commission on Human Relationships. Betts' research reviews evidence from comprehensive studies on the biological basis of the Billings Method. The evidence shows that even amongst women who monitored both their body temperature and vaginal mucus levels, mucus symptoms were "erratic." In one study of 166 women who recorded 1,600 menstrual cycles, 75% of participants could observe mucus in every cycle, while 21% could only notice this sometimes, and the rest couldn't measure mucus at all. Other studies showed that women were more likely to get pregnant using the Billings method than women using other methods, such as the oral contraceptive pill, IUDs, condoms and diaphragms. Most of these women said they either abandoned the Billings method or miscalculated because the method was either "too complicated," or there were "too many rules to follow" or there were "too many qualifications" to observe. Betts argues that while all methods of contraception require that individuals adhere to proper use, the Billings method was still less effective than other methods and she questioned the Government's continued support of this as a primary family planning strategy.

While Betts continued to research population issues over the next two decades, she returned to specific topic of women's fertility issues and population in the mid-to-late 2000s. During the October 2004 Federal election, Christian lobby groups and Coalition candidates ran a campaign advocating that the Australian population was largely against abortion. Betts drew on empirical data from population surveys which showed that 81% of the Australian population was resolutely pro-choice, while only 9% were firmly against abortion.
