= Naomi Betts =

American criminal

Naomi Betts (born c. 1982) is an American bank robber who robbed the Fifth Third Bank in Indianapolis, Indiana, United States on October 9, 2003. She was arrested on May 27, 2004, after a May 22, 2004, airing of America's Most Wanted. During the robbery, she did not even attempt to conceal her face. Since October 2003, Indianapolis law enforcement had been breaking state records by spending over $500,000 in attempting to capture Betts. The funds were spent on radio, newspaper, and television announcements about the hunt for her.

She was arrested in Sikeston, Missouri, where she was living with family. At the time of her arrest, she was 22 years old. Her male accomplice is still at large.
