= J. Warren Bettis =

Ohio judge

John Warren Bettis (October 24, 1924 – June 23, 2011) was an Ohio jurist who served as a judge on the Ohio Court of Claims.

== Early life ==
Bettis was born in Salineville, Ohio. He died at his home in Salem, Ohio

== Military service ==
He enlisted in the United States Marine Corps in 1943 and spent boot camp in San Diego, California. His advanced individual training was spent on the Big Island of Hawaii as an infantry man. After completing his training, he was assigned to the 5th Marine Division, 26th Regiment. His regiment landed on Iwo Jima on February 19, 1945 and participated in the Battle of Iwo Jima; he was shot in the face on March 1, 1945. He was awarded the Purple Heart for injuries he received. He was a member of the Salineville American Legion.

== Legal career ==
Bettis earned his law degree at the Salmon P. Chase College of Law in 1952.

He practiced law from 1952 to 1970. He then served as the county prosecutor for Columbiana County, Ohio, from 1965 to 1970. He then was elevated to the bench, serving as a judge of the Columbiana County Common Pleas Court from 1970 to 1986. From 1986 to 1993, Bettis served as disciplinary counsel to the Ohio Supreme Court, after which he retired.

Bettis sat on the Court of Claims by appointment (1994–2011).

Bettis also served in the Ohio House of Representatives and as a commissioner of the Public Utilities Commission of Ohio.
