= Gilbert Betts =

English cricketer

Personal information
- Full name: Gilbert Frederick Betts
- Born: 21 December 1916; Fulbrook, Oxfordshire
- Died: 5 January 1982 (aged 65); Abingdon, Oxfordshire
- Batting: Right-handed
- Bowling: Right-arm fast-medium

Domestic team information
- Years: Team
- 1951: Minor Counties
- 1950–1956: Oxfordshire

Career statistics
| Competition | First-class |
|---|---|
| Matches | 1 |
| Runs scored | 1 |
| Batting average | 0.50 |
| 100s/50s | 0/0 |
| Top score | 1 |
| Balls bowled | 156 |
| Wickets | 5 |
| Bowling average | 19.00 |
| 5 wickets in innings | 1 |
| 10 wickets in match | 0 |
| Best bowling | 5/95 |
| Catches/stumpings | 1/– |
- Source: Cricinfo, 2 May 2012

Gilbert Frederick Betts (21 December 1916 – 5 January 1982) was an English cricketer. Betts was a right-handed batsman who bowled right-arm fast-medium. He was born at Fulbrook, Oxfordshire.

Betts made his debut in county cricket for Oxfordshire in the 1950 Minor Counties Championship against Devon. From 1950 to 1956, Betts made 31 appearances for the county in the Minor Counties Championship, the last of which came against Wiltshire. In 1951, he made his only appearance in first-class cricket for a combined Minor Counties team against Kent at the St Lawrence Ground, Canterbury. Batting first, Kent made 365/8 declared, with Betts taking five wickets in the innings, finishing with figures of 5/95. In response, the Minor Counties made 169 all out in their first-innings, with Betts, who batted at number eleven, being dismissed for a duck by Simon Kimmins. Forced to follow-on in their second-innings, the Minor Counties fared little better, making 186, with Betts the last man out when he was dismissed for a single run by Ray Dovey. Kent won the match by an innings and 10 runs.

He died at Abingdon, Oxfordshire, on 5 January 1982.
