= Randy Bettis =

- Birth name: Raymond Randall Bettis
- Born: March 10, 1959 (age 66); Jacksonville, Illinois, US
- Genres: House, progressive house
- Occupation(s): Musician, DJ, record producer
- Years active: 1997–present
- Website: facebook.com/djrandybettis

Raymond Randall Bettis (born March 10, 1959, in Jacksonville, Illinois) is an American DJ, remixer, and producer of dance music.

== History ==
Randy Bettis's family consists of country singer and former shipping department manager for the defunct J. Capps & Sons, Bob Bettis (deceased) and seamstress Iris J. Gregory (deceased), brother Robert E. Bettis Jr. and sister Shari Lynn Bettis.

He attended Southern Illinois University on a partial scholarship as a member of the Saluki Gymnastics Team, coached by multiple-time Olympic coach Bill Meade, where Bettis broke numerous records in both floor exercise and vaulting.

After three years working at Opryland USA in Nashville, Tennessee, as a dancer and then assistant to the choreographer, he went on to pursue a career in musical theater. He toured with the Hamburg, Germany production of Cats and two years later returned to the United States to join the fourth national tour of Cats as Tumblebrutus, eventually joining the Broadway company from 1989 to 1991 and 1996 to 1997.

In 1992 Bettis was a part of the dance group Boys Back East, who were the grand national champions on Star Search.

In 1992, he joined the Broadway revival of Guys & Dolls, in 1994 moved over to the Broadway production of Miss Saigon, and later that year joined the first national tour of Miss Saigon from 1994 to 1996.

In 1997 Bettis left the theater to pursue a career as a nightclub DJ and a music producer and remix artist.

Bettis broke through in 2005 with back-to-back performances at three of the largest dance parties in the world: The Saint at Large's New Years Day Event, at Capitale; Saint at Large's the Black Party, at Roseland Ballroom; and the Heritage of Pride Pier Dance in New York City. That same year, Bettis was named by Billboard to the nationwide panel of club DJs who create Billboard's weekly Hot Dance Club Play Chart.

In 2006, he embarked on his first self-produced national tour to promote his latest album, GayDays Tour 2006. The tour visited 26 cities nationwide and was voted best circuit tour of 2006 (and again in 2007 and 2008) by the members of JustCircuit.com.

That same year he launched a weekly mixshow on G.I.R.L. (GayInternetRadioLive.com) with satellite broadcasts on SIRIUS Radio's OutQ Saturday Night Out. Bettis continues to wow dance floors at live gigs throughout the country and via his Radio Mixshow on EagleRadio.pro.

Bettis made his Chinese debut in 2011, and headlined the official Riptide event in Orlando, Florida, part of Gay Days Weekend in 2011 and 2012.

== Residencies ==
- 1999–2001: Limelight – New York City
- 2000–2002: Blu – New York City
- 2001–2002: XL – New York City
- 2001–2003: Paramount – Provincetown, Mass.
- 2002–2003: Serena – New York City
- 2005–2006: Velvet Nation – Washington, D.C.
- 2007: Stereo NY – New York City
- 2003–2015: The Blue Whale – Fire Island Pines, N.Y.
- 2005–2015: Pavilion – Fire Island Pines, N.Y.
- 2005–2014: Voyeur (formerly Pure) Nightclub, Philadelphia
- 2006-2007: The Monster – New York City
- 2003–2012: Splash Bar – New York City
- 2007–2014: Town Discoboutique – Washington, D.C.
- 2012–2015: Paradise Nightclub – Asbury Park, N.J.

== BetBoyz ==
In production, Bettis works with music partner David J. Boyd (AKA BetBoyz) on original and remix productions. Specializing in dance music, they also collaborate on musical theater and pop productions. BetBoyz has worked with and created remixes for some of the industry's biggest artists, including Taylor Dayne, Alicia Keys, Levi Kreis, Inaya Day, Jenn Cuneta and Ari Gold.

BetBoyz has appeared at charitable events such as Broadway Cares/Equity Fights AIDS' Dancers Responding to AIDS, AVP: The Anti-Violence Project and Marriage Equality. In 2009 they co-wrote/produced Free To Love (The Equality Project) with Robbyne Kaamil; created the original mix and secured additional mixes from remixers DJ JST, Amy Alderman/Bryan Reyes, Tony Ruiz, Almond Brown and DJ Nawttyboy; and donated 100% of the proceeds to Broadway Impact, a marriage equality branch of BCEFA. Bettis has also lent his talents and time in support of the Anti-Violence Project of NY and Immigration Equality.

In 2010, BetBoyz wrote and produced the music for the hit Off-Broadway musical My Big Gay Italian Wedding (co-produced by Real Housewives of New Jersey's Dina Manzo, Sonia Blangiardo, AnnDee Productions, Eileen Caruso, Teresa A. Cicala, Donna DiCrescento, Frank Levinson and Dolores Naso) and co-wrote/produced the single "Up To The Sky" for Reichen Lehmkule.

On July 23, 2012, The Groove Factory (co-produced by BetBoyz) premiered at the Theatre at St. Clement's, part of the 2012 New York Musical Theatre Festival. The musical includes the first-ever all-electronic score, and chronicled the story of friends at the turn of the millennium, at the end of what was known as "the heyday of New York City Clubland". It starred recording artist Kim Sozzi.

== Personal life ==
Bettis resides in New York City with his husband, Patrick Sean Dwyer. Together since 1997, they were married on April 8, 2011.

== Discography ==
=== Albums ===
- 2004: PARTY GROOVE: GAYS DAYS – Vol. 1
- 2005: PARTY GROOVE: GAYS DAYS – Vol. 2
- 2006: PARTY GROOVE: GAYS DAYS – Vol. 3
- 2007: PARTY GROOVE: GAYS DAYS – Vol. 4
- 2008: PARTY GROOVE: GAYS DAYS – Vol. 5
- 2009: PARTY GROOVE: GAYS DAYS – Vol. 6
- 2010: PARTY GROOVE: GAYS DAYS – Vol. 7
- 2010: PARTY GROOVE: WHITE PARTY 10 – The 25th Anniversary Edition
- 2011: PARTY GROOVE: CHERRY – Vol. 4''
- 2011: PARTY GROOVE: GAYS DAYS – Vol. 8
- 2012: PARTY GROOVE: GAYS DAYS – Vol. 9
- 2013: PARTY GROOVE: GAY DAYS – Vol. 10
- 2013: WURKOUT – Vol. 3
- 2014: PARTY GROOVE: GAY DAYS – Vol. 11
- 2015: PARTY GROOVE: GAY DAYS – Vol. 12
- 2017: Pulse Orlando Gay Days Benefit Album
