= Mike Betts =

English footballer

Personal information
- Full name: Michael James Betts
- Date of birth: 21 September 1956 (age 70)
- Place of birth: Barnsley, England
- Position: Centre-back

Senior career*
Years	Team	Apps	(Gls)
1975–1976	Blackpool	7	(0)
1976–1977	Sligo Rovers	25	(5)
1977	New York Apollo		
1977–1978	Shamrock Rovers	1	(0)
1979	Cleveland Cobras		
1979–1980	Southport	2	(0)
1979–1980	Northwich Victoria	1	(0)
1980–1981	Bury	1	(0)
- * Club domestic league appearances and goals

Michael Betts (born 21 September 1956) is an English retired professional footballer who played as a centre-back.

== Career ==
Betts played in the Blackpool youth system. In 1974, the Blackpool youths won the Caligaris International Tournament. In 1975, he moved up to the first team. In 1976, he transferred to Sligo Rovers where he won Sligo's first ever League of Ireland Championship in the 1976–77 season.

In November 1977 he signed for John Giles at Shamrock Rovers where he made his only league appearance at Glenmalure Park. Despite scoring the winner against a Manchester United selection the same week he left Ireland soon after.

In 1979, Betts played for the Cleveland Cobras in the American Soccer League.

== Honours ==
Sligo Rovers

- League of Ireland: 1976–77
