= Emmett Ethridge Butler =

American physician

Emmett Ethridge Butler (1908-1955) was a physician practicing in Gainesville, Georgia.

He was born in Jefferson and grew up in Macon. He was a graduate of Morehouse College. He received his M.D. from Meharry Medical College in 1934.

He was the first African-American to be appointed to the Gainesville Board of Education.

He died on May 5, 1955, of carcinoma of the stomach.

Shortly after his death a segregated school was renamed after him. Today the E.E. Butler Parkway in Gainesville is named after him.
