= Shaftesbury Memorial Fountain =

Memorial in Piccadilly Circus, London

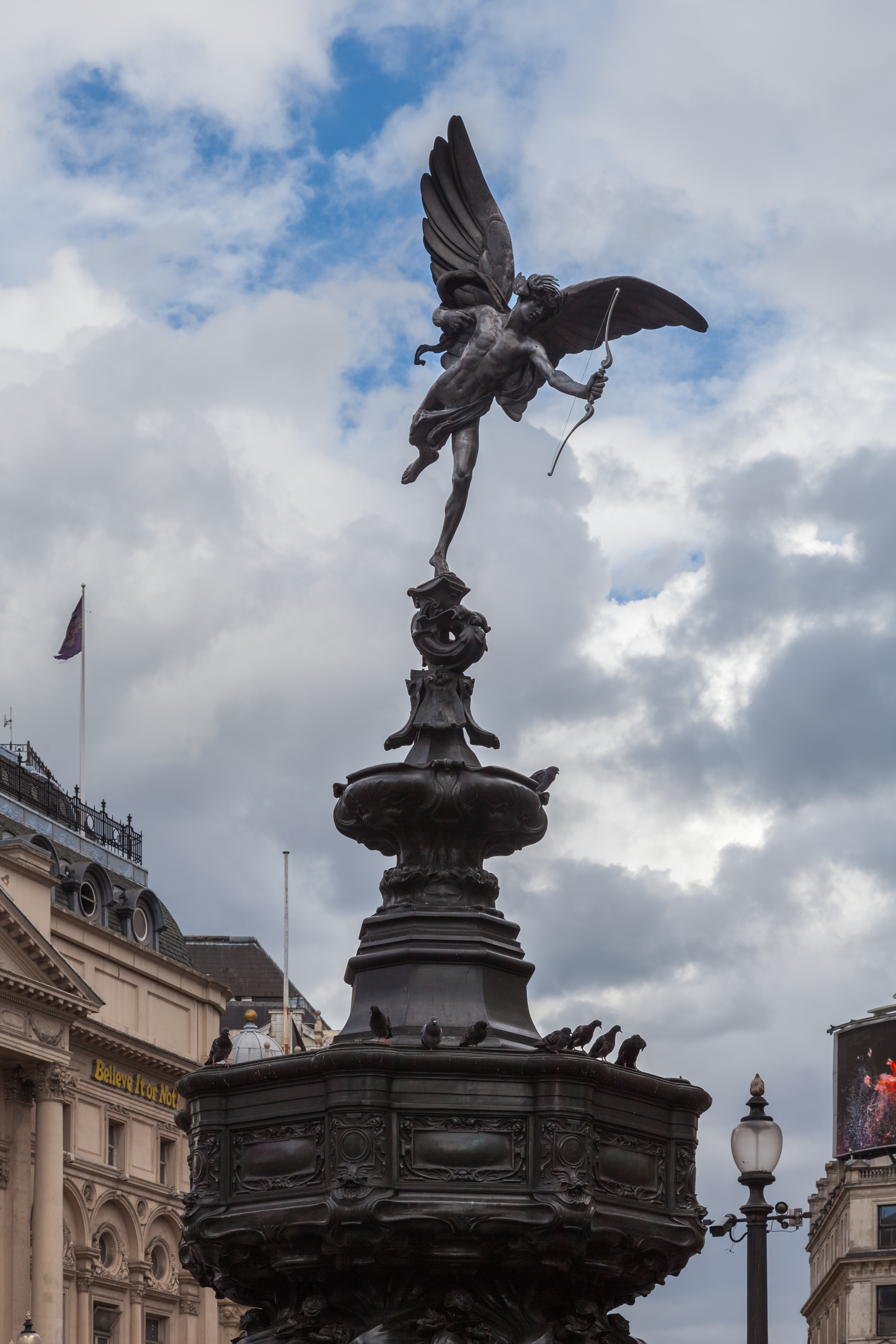
- The fountain in 2014
- Artist: Alfred Gilbert
- Year: 1885–1893
- Type: Fountain, sculpture
- Medium: Aluminium, bronze
- Dimensions: 1097 cm × 518 cm (432 in × 204 in)
- Location: Piccadilly Circus, London, W1; 51.50984°N 0.13449°W

The Shaftesbury Memorial Fountain, popularly but mistakenly known as Eros, is a fountain surmounted by a winged statue of Anteros, located at the southeastern side of Piccadilly Circus in London, England. Moved after the Second World War from its original position in the centre of the circus, it was erected in 1892–93 to commemorate the philanthropic works of Anthony Ashley Cooper, 7th Earl of Shaftesbury, the Victorian politician and philanthropist, and his achievement in replacing child labour with school education. The fountain overlooks the south-west end of Shaftesbury Avenue, also named after the Earl.

== Description and history ==
Sixteen days after the death of Lord Shaftesbury, a public meeting was held at the Mansion House to discuss a national memorial. A Shaftesbury Memorial Committee, chaired by the Lord Mayor of London, announced that "two statues should be erected to the memory of the late Earl". A marble one for Westminster Abbey and a bronze one "should be erected on a conspicuous site in one of the most frequented public thoroughfares in London". The committee also recommended that a national home for poor children be established (later the Shaftesbury Homes), and launched a public appeal for funds.

The Metropolitan Board of Works originally offered a site in Cambridge Circus at the intersection of two new streets, one of which was named Shaftesbury Avenue shortly afterwards. However, the Memorial Committee suggested that they preferred the Piccadilly end of the new street. No decision had been reached before the Board of Works was replaced by the London County Council in 1889. Meanwhile, the commission for the bronze statue had been awarded to 32 year-old Alfred Gilbert, who deplored what he called the "coat and trousers" style of public statues. He stated to the Memorial committee that:

I can't undertake the statue of Lord Shaftesbury; I prefer something that will symbolize his life's work. The life of Lord Shaftesbury lent itself to that, rather than the glorification of the tailor.

Gilbert's use of a nude figure on a public monument was controversial at the time of its construction, but it was generally well received by the public. The Magazine of Art described it as "a striking contrast to the dull ugliness of the generality of our street sculpture, ... a work which, while beautifying one of our hitherto desolate open spaces, should do much towards the elevation of public taste in the direction of decorative sculpture, and serve freedom for the metropolis from any further additions of the old order of monumental monstrosities." The statue has been called "London's most famous work of sculpture"; a graphical illustration of it is used as the symbol of the Evening Standard newspaper and appears on its masthead. It was the first sculpture in the world to be cast in aluminium and is set on a bronze fountain, which itself inspired the marine motifs that Gilbert carved on the statue.

Although the statue is generally known as Eros, it was created as an image of that Greek god's brother, Anteros. Gilbert had already sculpted a statue of Anteros and, when commissioned for the Shaftesbury Memorial Fountain, chose to reproduce the same subject, who, as "The God of Selfless Love" was deemed to represent the philanthropic 7th Earl of Shaftesbury suitably. Gilbert described Anteros as portraying "reflective and mature love, as opposed to Eros or Cupid, the frivolous tyrant." Gilbert commented on his reason for the statue, saying:

As to the figure surmounting the whole if I must confess to a meaning or a raison d être for its being there I confess to have been actuated in its design by a desire to symbolise the work of Lord Shaftesbury the blindfolded Love sending forth indiscriminately yet with purpose his missile of kindness always with the swiftness the bird has from its wings never ceasing to breathe or reflect critically but ever soaring onwards regardless of its own peril and dangers.

The model for the sculpture was Gilbert's studio assistant, a 16-year-old Anglo-Italian, Angelo Colarossi (born 1875 in Shepherd's Bush). Fernando Meacci was involved in the moulding of the fountain and it was probably cast by George Broad & Son.

The memorial was unveiled by Hugh Grosvenor, 1st Duke of Westminster on 29 June 1893. Following the unveiling there were numerous complaints. Some felt it was sited in a vulgar part of town (the theatre district), and others felt that it was too sensual as a memorial for a famously sober and respectable Earl. Some of the objections were tempered by renaming the statue as The Angel of Christian Charity, which was the nearest approximation that could be invented in Christian terms for the role Anteros played in the Greek pantheon. However, the name never became widely known and the statue was thence referred to as Eros, the god of sensual love; inappropriate some said in relation to the Earl's commemoration, but hailed by others as an ironic representation of the more carnal side of the neighbourhood, into which Soho had developed.

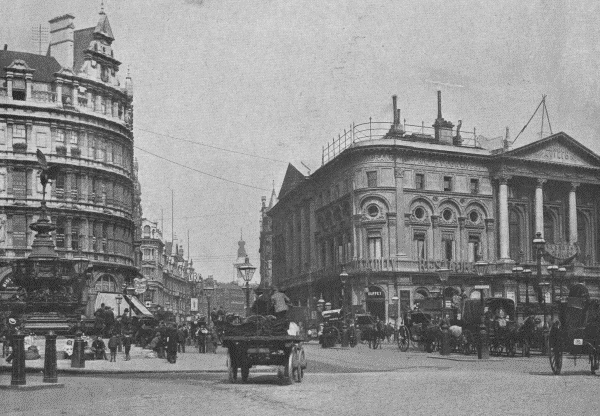
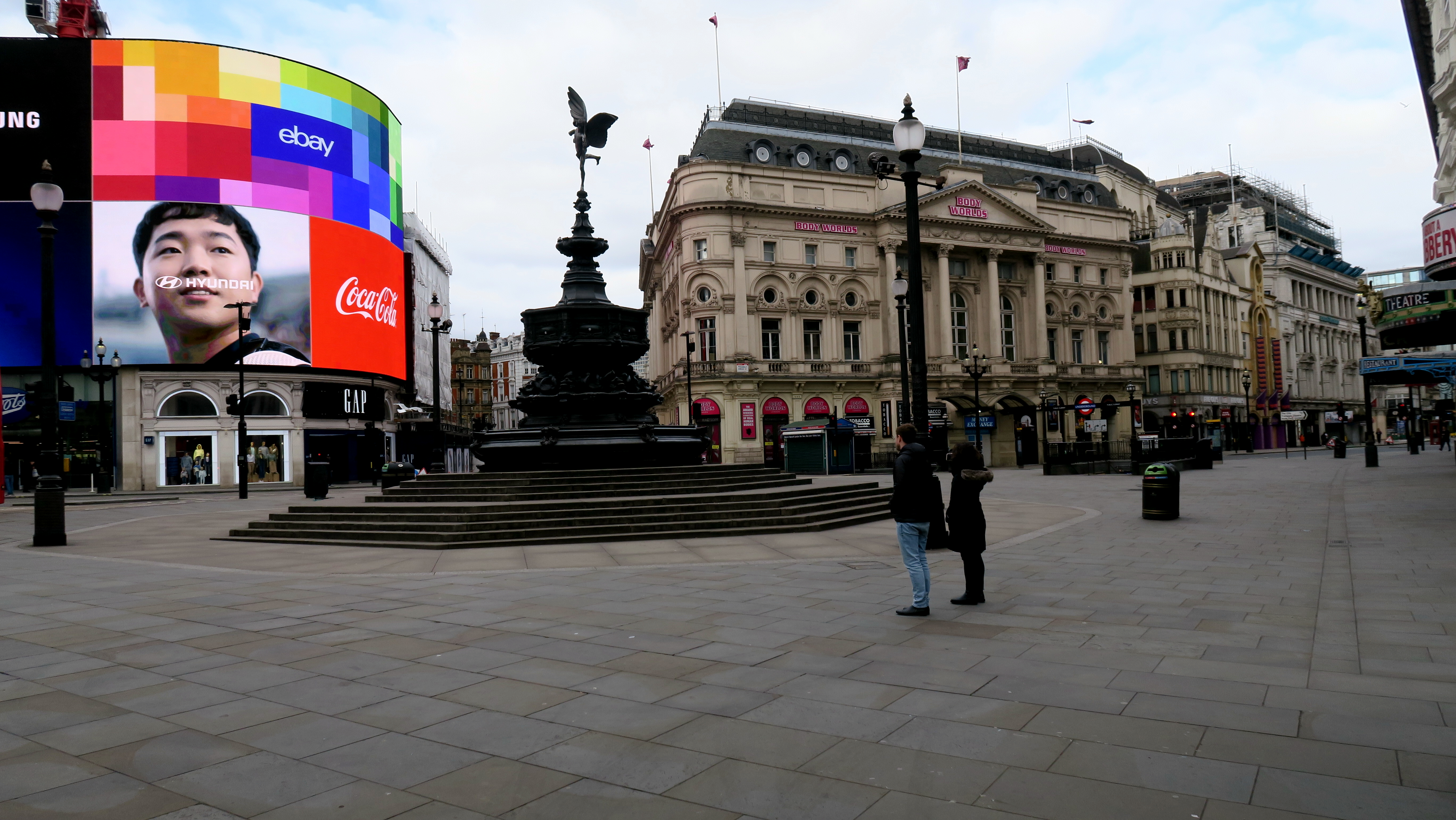
1896 and 2020 pictures taken from the same approximate position, showing the monument's original, pre-World War II position, and its present site

The whole memorial has been removed from the circus twice. In 1925, construction began on the new tube station directly beneath the memorial. The memorial was taken away and put in Embankment Gardens, until it was returned in 1931. When the Second World War broke out in 1939, the statue only was removed for safety at Coopers Hill, a large country house near Egham in Surrey, which had been bought by the London County Council in 1938 as an emergency headquarters; the pediment of the fountain remained in place and was protected by sandbags The statue was returned to Piccadilly Circus on 29 June 1947, watched by a crowd of thousands despite heavy rain; two flower sellers also returned, who each claimed to have been working there for more than fifty years. During the festivities for the Coronation of Elizabeth II in 1953, the fountain was protected from revellers by an ormamental cage designed by Sir Hugh Casson.

The statue was again removed in the 1980s – this time for restoration – and resited upon its return in February 1985. During the restoration, comparison with a set of plaster casts in the Victoria and Albert Museum revealed damage to the statue. The statue was vandalised in 1990 and, after radiography and restoration, returned in 1994. In May 2012 the statue had a new bow string fitted after the original had been broken by a tourist.

In the winter of 2013/14, the statue was covered with a PVC snow globe featuring internal fans blowing the "snowflakes". This also had the function of protecting the statue from vandalism and it was planned to return in subsequent years. However, strong winds caused the globe to become damaged and deflate and it was not subsequently repaired. In the winter of 2014/15, octagonal advertising hoardings forming a box for giant Christmas presents served a similar function.

== See also ==
- 1893 in art
- Art Gallery of South Australia, which has a replica
- Greek mythology in western art and literature
- Sefton Park, a park in Liverpool with a replica
