= Jack Betts (journalist) =

American journalist

- Education: University of North Carolina at Chapel Hill
- Occupations: Journalist; columnist
- Years active: 1968–2011
- Employer: Charlotte Observer
- Military career
- Allegiance: United States
- Branch: United States Army

Jack Betts was a journalist and columnist for the Charlotte Observer, where he retired as the Associate Editor in 2011. Based in Raleigh, North Carolina, he wrote primarily on topics related to North Carolina government and politics. Betts and his wife Martha live near Dan, Virginia.

== Education ==
Betts graduated from the University of North Carolina at Chapel Hill in 1968.

== Career ==
After graduating college, Betts served as a photographer in the United States Army. He then became a Washington correspondent for Greensboro Daily News, Roanoke Times, and Norfolk Virginia-Plot. He was also an editor of North Carolina Insight magazine while also being a member of the editorial board of the Observer. Here he was responsible for writing daily editorials, blogposts, and a weekly column. After working for the Charlotte Observer for 40 years, Betts decided to retire in 2011. Betts now writes a blog called Rocky Knob Blog.

== Awards and honors ==
Betts has won awards from the North Carolina Press Association and has been inducted into the North Carolina Journalism Hall of Fame.
