= Hans-Georg Betz =

German university teacher

Hans-Georg Betz is an academic at the University of Zurich. He is the author of several books on right-wing populism including Radical Right-Wing Populism in Western Europe and The New Politics of the Right: Neo-Populist Parties and Movements in Established Democracies.
