= William Betts (chaplain) =

William Betts or Bettes (died 1535) was a clergyman who became the chaplain and close supporter of Anne Boleyn, the second wife of King Henry VIII of England. He was an associate of Matthew Parker, who on Betts' death was given his position as the Queen's chaplain, before going on to become archbishop of Canterbury.

Betts was part of a group of clergymen who were involved with circulating forbidden theological books in Oxford in 1528. Others involved in this included Thomas Garret, Thomas Bilney, Hugh Latimer and Matthew Parker. It was discovered by Cardinal Thomas Wolsey and Anne Boleyn herself seems to have interceded to protect at least one of the men.

Betts started his career at Gonville Hall before moving on to Corpus Christi.
