= George Betts (cricketer, born 1843) =

English cricketer

George Betts (19 September 1843 – 26 September 1902) was an English first-class cricketer, who played two matches for Yorkshire County Cricket Club between 1873 and 1874. A right-handed batsman, he scored 56 runs at 18.66, with a best of 44 not out against Gloucestershire.

Born in Sheffield, Betts made his debut against Gloucestershire in 1873 at Clifton, and performed well in the second innings, despite Yorkshire going down to a five wicket defeat. Batting at number 7 he remained unbeaten on 44, as Yorkshire were bowled out for 287, following on from Gloucestershire's first innings of 404, in which G. F. Grace scored 165. Betts was not selected again that year, and his second, and final, match came in 1874, was against Surrey when, batting at 4, he recorded a pair as Yorkshire ran out winners by 198 runs.

Betts died in Sheffield, aged 61, in September 1902.
