= Friends of Man =

Christian denomination founded in 1919

The Friends of Man are a Christian denomination founded in 1919 by Frédéric-Louis-Alexandre Freytag, the former Branch manager of the Swiss Watch Tower Society since 1912. He founded a group first named the Angel of the Lord (this name was inspired by a verse of the Apocalypse), Angel of Jehovah Bible and Tract Society, then Church of the Kingdom of God or the Philanthropic Assembly of the Friends of Man.

== History ==
The group began when Freytag started publishing his own personal views and sent The Message of Laodicea (Le Message de Laodicée), in which he claimed he was the legitimate successor of Charles Taze Russell, to the Bible Students. Therefore, he was ousted from the Watch Tower Society by Joseph Rutherford in 1920. He published two journals, the monthly The Monitor of the Reign of Justice (Le Moniteur du Règne de Justice) and the weekly Newspaper for All (Le Journal pour tous).

In Italy, the first community was founded in 1946 in Turin by Sebastiano Chiardola.

When Freytag died in 1947, one of his followers, Bernard Sayerce (1912–1963), a Roman Catholic schoolteacher, claimed he was his successor. Almost all of the 900 French and Belgian assemblies joined this new group which had a peak of 9,700 members between 1958 and 1962. In 1963, Lydie Sartre (1898–1972), who was named the "Dear Mom", then Joseph Neyrand (1927–1981) in 1971, replaced Sayerce as leaders of the movement, named "Amis sans frontières" in 1984.

== Beliefs and practices ==
The movement theology includes Christian doctrines of restorationism and millennialism. Its beliefs can be found in Freytag's writings: The Divine Revelation (La Divine Révélation, 1920), The Message to Humanity (Le Message à l'Humanité, 1922) and The Eternal Life (La Vie éternelle, 1933). The movement stresses the need to change the character of humanity by practicing the Gospel. Members believe that only 144,000 persons, who are the Kingdom of God's members, will go to heaven. They are antitrinitarian and believe in a sole God, Jehovah. They are vegetarian.

In 1951 the movement turned increasingly to philanthropy: help for disadvantaged, disaster relief and material donations for farmers.

They celebrate the feast of the Army of the Lord on 18 April and the feast of the little flock on 18 October. The weekly four meetings are largely devoted to study of the founder's writings. Baptism and the Last Supper are celebrated only within the Swiss branch, not in France.

== Organization ==
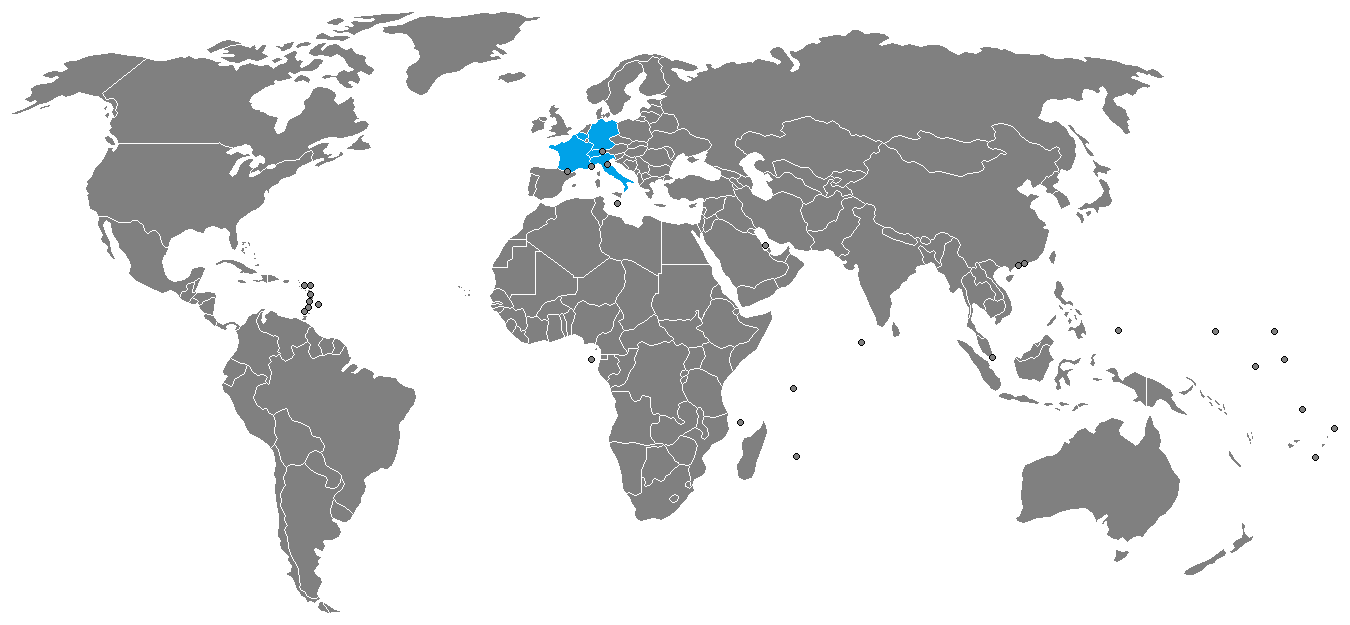
Friends of Man in the world

The movement was later under the leadership of Édouard Rufener, then Marie Roulin, then Mr. Kohli. An elder oversees a community.

The main headquarters are in Cartigny, Switzerland. In France, the national headquarters were located in rue Amelot, in the 11th arrondissement of Paris, with a strong influence in the south-west, before moving to Les Ormeaux, in Lot-et-Garonne. Every year, there are one or two congresses composed of speeches, artistic galas and concerts (e.g. at the Parc des Princes in 1948 and 1949, in Bordeaux in 1950 and in Toulouse in 1951). Regional meetings are also organized in European countries as well as in non European countries such as Algeria and Morocco.

The 71,500 members are active in twenty countries, including Switzerland, Germany, France, Belgium, UK, U.S., Mexico, Brazil, Canada, Australia, but particularly in Italy.
