= Georgia Department of Public Health =

Public health agency of Georgia, U.S.

Agency overview
- Formed: 2011; 15 years ago
- Preceding agency: Division of Public Health, Georgia Department of Community Health
- Jurisdiction: Georgia
- Headquarters: 200 Piedmont Avenue SE; Atlanta, Georgia 30334
- Employees: approx. 6,000
- Agency executive: Kathleen E. Toomey, Commissioner and State Health Officer
- Parent agency: Executive branch of Georgia
- Website: dph.georgia.gov

The Georgia Department of Public Health (DPH) is the state-level public health agency for the U.S. state of Georgia. Its stated purpose is to prevent disease, promote health, and prepare for and respond to disasters from a health perspective. The department is organized into divisions, sections, programs, and offices, and locally funds and collaborates with Georgia's 159 county health departments, organized into 18 public health districts. DPH became an independent state agency in 2011.

== History ==
Prior to 2011, Georgia's public health functions were spread across larger state agencies, including the Department of Human Resources and the Department of Community Health. In 2009, the state created the Public Health Commission, an independent panel of nine experts that, citing a decline in public health spending despite rising population and health care costs, recommended that the state establish a standalone public health agency. The Georgia General Assembly created DPH in 2011 through House Bill 214 and accompanying budget legislation, restoring public health to its own state agency after more than 30 years of consolidation with other departments. The new department is led by a commissioner, who also serves as the state's health officer.

== Organization and leadership ==
DPH's commissioner is appointed by the Governor of Georgia. The agency is advised by a State Board of Public Health, which works with local boards of health organized within the state's 18 public health districts and serves in an advisory rather than governing capacity over the department's daily operations.

As of 2026, the commissioner and state health officer is Kathleen E. Toomey, M.D., M.P.H., who was appointed by Governor Brian P. Kemp in March 2019. Toomey, an epidemiologist and board-certified family practitioner, previously directed the Fulton County Department of Health and Wellness and held leadership positions with the Centers for Disease Control and Prevention, including serving as the agency's country director in Botswana. She succeeded Brenda Fitzgerald, who left the commissioner role in 2017 after being appointed director of the CDC by President Donald Trump; Fitzgerald was succeeded on an interim basis by J. Patrick O'Neal, the agency's then-director of Health Protection.

== Functions and divisions ==
DPH's stated functions include health promotion and disease prevention, maternal and child health, infectious disease and immunization, environmental health, epidemiology, emergency preparedness and response, emergency medical services, pharmacy, nursing, volunteer health care, health equity, vital records, and operation of the State Public Health Laboratory. The agency has approximately nine divisions, divided into about 40 programs and offices, and employs roughly 6,000 people statewide.

Locally, the agency funds and collaborates with Georgia's 159 county health departments, which are led by county boards of health and staffed by local government employees; each county health department falls within one of the state's 18 public health districts, whose regional offices are led by a district health director employed by the state and which provide technical assistance and administrative support to the county departments. County health departments deliver direct services such as maternal and child health programs, immunizations, treatment for sexually transmitted infections, education programs, and restaurant inspections.

The department's Office of HIV/AIDS connects people living with HIV to health care and support services and manages federal funding for HIV care through the Health Resources and Services Administration's Ryan White HIV/AIDS program, including the Healthcare Insurance Continuation Program and the AIDS Drug Assistance Program.

== See also ==
- Georgia Department of Community Health
- Centers for Disease Control and Prevention
