= Bette =

Bette may refer to:

== People and fictional characters ==
- Bette (given name), a list of people and fictional characters
- Jean-Christophe Bette, French competitive rower
- The noble House of Bette: the Marquess of Lede:
  - Guillaum de Bette, 1st Marquess of Lede
  - Ambroise de Bette, 2nd Marquess of Lede
  - Jean François de Bette, 3rd Marquess of Lede
  - Emannuel de Bette, 4th Marquess of Lede
  - Françoise de Bette
- Bette people, a Bantu people in Nigeria

== Other uses ==
- Bette (album), by Bette Midler
- Bette (TV series), starring Bette Midler
- Bikku Bitti, formerly Bette Peak, the highest point in Libya

== See also ==
- Bete (disambiguation)
- Bet (disambiguation)
