= John Betts (surgeon and philanthropist) =

English physician and philanthropist

Dr John Betts (1799–1875) was an English medical doctor and philanthropist who endowed schools in the Hammersmith area of London.

== Biography ==
John Betts was born in 1799 and studied medicine from 1815 to 1821 at Marylebone Infirmary, becoming a Qualified Licentiate of the Society of Apothecaries.

By 1834 he was recorded as a surgeon, residing at 3, Grove Place, West London. This is now 314 King Street, Hammersmith.

He died in July, 1875, and his funeral service was held at St Peter's Hammersmith. He is buried in Hammersmith Cemetery (now known as Margravine Cemetery).

== Legacy ==
By 1859 Dr Betts had drawn up plans for an educational trust, the St Peter's Hammersmith Free Schools Trust.

The Trust provided for a school with three classrooms, one each for boys, girls and infants, to accommodate 350 pupils, together with two staff cottages.

Dr Betts specified the curriculum and set up an endowment to fund the school and provide for the children's needs.

The school started as St Peter's Hammersmith Free Schools, was later known as the Paddenswick Road Schools. Today it is known as the John Betts Primary School.

The current charitable foundation was incorporated in 2018.
