= George Betts (cricketer, born 1808) =

English cricketer (1808–1861)

Personal information
- Born: 1808; Bearsted, Kent
- Died: 7 October 1861 (aged 51–52); West Tilbury, Essex
- Batting: Right-handed
- Bowling: Right-arm slow

Domestic team information
- Years: Team
- 1835: Kent
- FC debut: 27 August 1832 Gentlemen v Players
- Last FC: 27 July 1835 Kent v England
- Source: CricInfo, 24 June 2022

George Betts (1808 – 7 October 1861) was an influential English cattle trader and butcher who played in two cricket matches during the 1830s.

Betts was born in 1808 and christened on 7 November at Bearsted in Kent. He was the son of George and Anne Betts (née Goodwin). His father was a butcher and Betts followed him into the trade, owning a butchers shop at Gravesend in Kent and a farm at West Tilbury in Essex. (Note: West Tilbury is across the River Thames from Gravesend. Ferries connecting the two locations have operated since at 1304.) He employed 13 workers on the farm and was something of a major figure in the South Essex cattle trade, the Gravesend Reporter writing that he was such a dominant figure that "he was the Tilbury Cattle Market".

Betts played club cricket for the Leeds and Bearsted team as well as for teams in Maidstone before moving to Gravesend in 1835 where he played for Gravesend Cricket Club. Five members of his family played for Leeds and Bearsted and in 1829 Betts and his brother Tom played a two-a-side match against a pair of brothers from Tovil. He made his important match debut in 1832, playing for Gentlemen against the Players at Lord's. Betts was almost certainly a late replacement, one of two who stepped in to play when members of the original Gentlemen's team did not arrive at the ground. He took at least one wicket in the match, (Note: During this period, wickets taken by bowlers were normally only recorded if they were bowled or out leg before wicket. Other means of dismissal were not credited to any bowler. As a result the number of wickets Betts took in any match is uncertain.) bowling Ned Wenman, (Note: Wenman was one of the leading wicket-keepers of the period and played regularly for Kent between 1825 and 1854. He played in almost 150 important matches.) but did not score a run in either innings.

Following the match Bell's Life in London predicted that Betts would "become equal to the first-rate bowlers of the day", although as a lob bowler he was at a disadvantage as roundarm bowling was becoming dominant. In the event, he played his other important match for Kent in 1835, playing against England (i.e., the "rest" of England) again at Lord's. Again he failed to score in either innings and took one known wicket, this time bowling Fuller Pilch. (Note: Pilch was one of the most dominant batsmen of the day and played more than 200 important matches. He played for Kent from 1836.) He is known to have played one other non-important match for Kent.

Betts married Jemima Smith in 1843 at Clerkenwell. The couple had seven children. He died from trismus in October 1861 a fortnight after a shotgun accident on his farm.

== Bibliography ==
- Carlaw, Derek (2020). Kent County Cricketers, A to Z: Part One (1806–1914) (PDF). Cardiff: ACS.
- Lewis, Paul (2014). For Kent and Country. Eastbourne: Reveille Press. ISBN 978-19-08336-63-7.
- Haygarth, Arthur (1996) [1862]. Scores & Biographies, Volume 1 (1744–1826). Kennington: Frederick Lillywhite. ISBN 978-19-00592-23-9.
- Haygarth, Arthur (1997) [1862]. Scores & Biographies, Volume 2 (1827–1840). Kennington: Frederick Lillywhite. ISBN 978-19-00592-23-9.
