= Hurricane Nicole (2016) =

Category 4 Atlantic hurricane

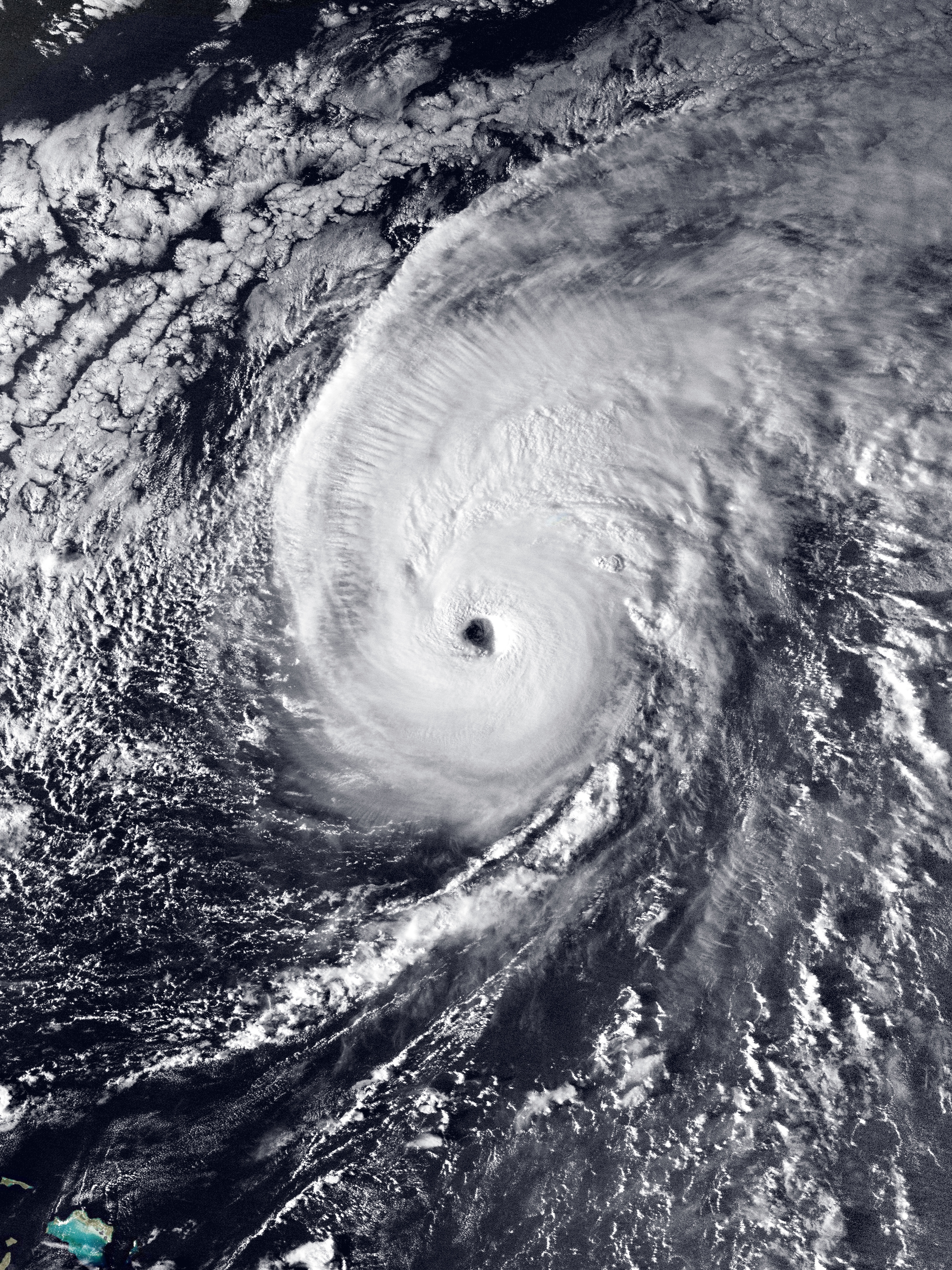
- Hurricane Nicole at peak intensity on October 13

Meteorological history
- Formed: October 4, 2016
- Extratropical: October 18, 2016
- Dissipated: October 20, 2016

Category 4 major hurricane
- 1-minute sustained (SSHWS/NWS)
- Highest winds: 140 mph (220 km/h)
- Lowest pressure: 950 mbar (hPa); 28.05 inHg

Overall effects
- Fatalities: 1 direct
- Missing: 1
- Damage: $15 million (2016 USD)
- Areas affected: Bermuda, North Atlantic Coastlines
- IBTrACS
- Part of the 2016 Atlantic hurricane season

Hurricane Nicole was the first major hurricane to directly impact Bermuda since Hurricane Fabian in 2003 and equally one of the strongest hurricanes to do so. The fourteenth named storm, sixth hurricane, and third major hurricane of the 2016 Atlantic hurricane season, Nicole formed in the central Atlantic on October 4. The small, slow-moving storm defied forecasts by steadily organizing despite strong wind shear, and it rapidly intensified to a Category 2 hurricane on October 7. The wind shear finally took its toll by October 8, reducing Nicole to a minimal tropical storm, as a building high pressure system forced the storm southward. Intensification began once again as the storm retreated toward Bermuda, and Nicole reached its peak intensity early on October 13 as a Category 4 hurricane with 140 mph (230 km/h) winds. Shortly thereafter, increased vertical wind shear weakened the storm to Category 3, and the eye passed over Bermuda later that day. Afterward, Nicole accelerated northeastwards while gradually weakening, but significantly expanding in size as it traversed the Northern Atlantic. By October 18, decreasing sea surface temperatures caused the large hurricane to become extratropical as it accelerated northwards toward Greenland.

The storm's approach and eventual impact on Bermuda forced schools, businesses, and government offices to close, while flight, bus, and ferry services were interrupted. One person drowned due to large swells that Nicole generated along its track that washed ashore along the East Coast of the United States. On the island of Bermuda, several people were injured, but no life-threatening injuries were reported. Overall, damage from Nicole amounted up to $15 million, which was less than what was anticipated.

== Meteorological history ==
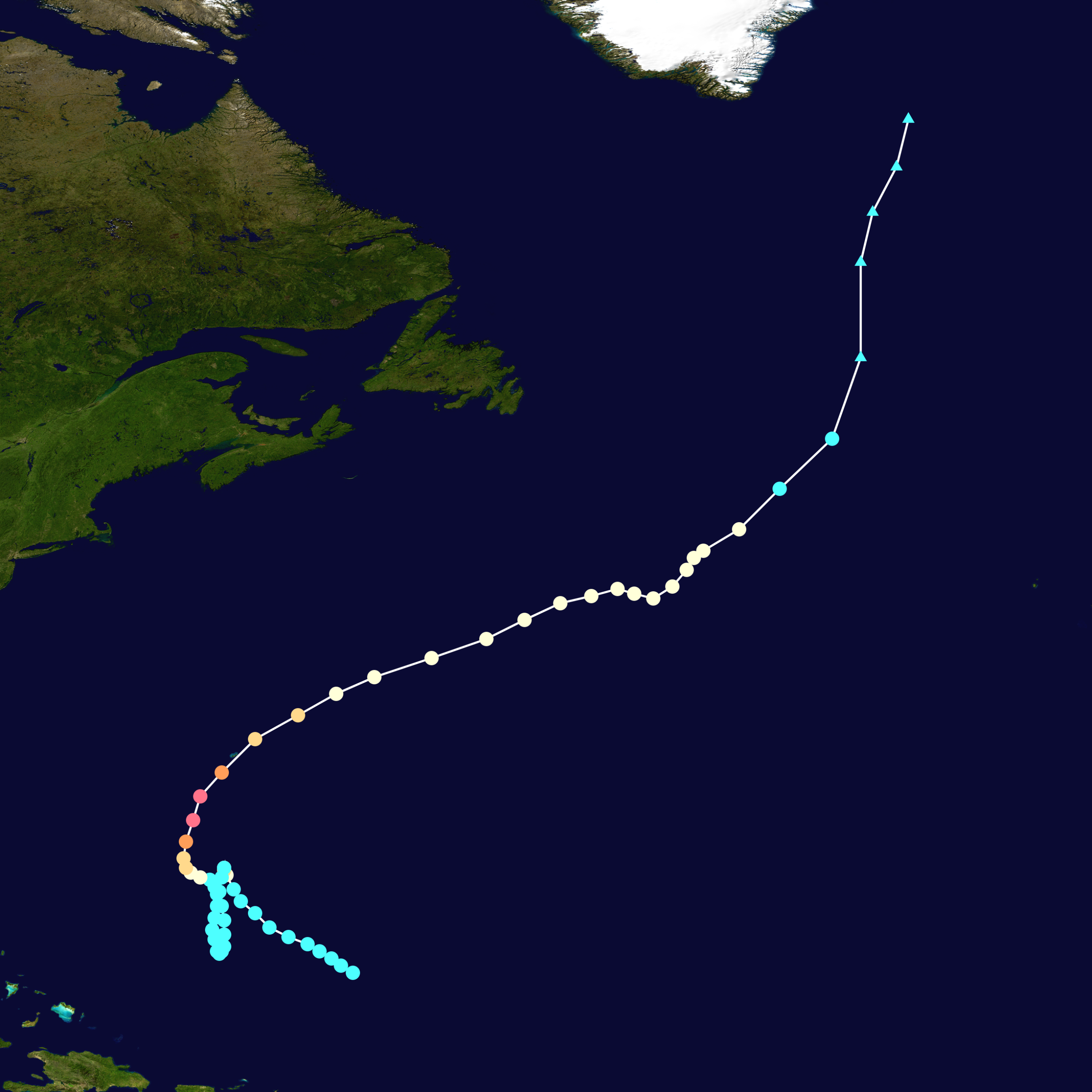
Map plotting the storm's track and intensity, according to the Saffir–Simpson scale Map key Saffir–Simpson scale Tropical depression (≤38 mph, ≤62 km/h) Tropical storm (39–73 mph, 63–118 km/h) Category 1 (74–95 mph, 119–153 km/h) Category 2 (96–110 mph, 154–177 km/h) Category 3 (111–129 mph, 178–208 km/h) Category 4 (130–156 mph, 209–251 km/h) Category 5 (≥157 mph, ≥252 km/h) Unknown Storm type Tropical cyclone Subtropical cyclone Extratropical cyclone, remnant low, tropical disturbance, or monsoon depression

On October 1, the National Hurricane Center (NHC) began monitoring a weak tropical wave-induced low-pressure area producing scattered showers and thunderstorms, along with winds just shy of tropical storm intensity, over the central Atlantic. Strong wind shear prevented the disturbance from organizing significantly as it tracked northwestward for the next several days. On October 4, satellite data confirmed the presence of a well-defined circulation center with gale-force winds. Around the same time, thunderstorm activity became better organized and banding features began to evolve over the eastern side of the disturbance. As a result, the NHC classified the system as Tropical Storm Nicole at 15:00 UTC, while it was located about 525 mi (845 km) northeast of San Juan, Puerto Rico. The storm, still plagued by inhibiting wind shear, was forecast to remain weak.

Nicole's cloud pattern gradually improved on October 5, partially shielded from the effects of wind shear by an upper-level low situated atop the tropical storm. Although convection remained lopsided, a distinct mid-level eye feature developed within the unusually small cyclone. The storm continued moving generally northwestward around a subtropical ridge to its north. Nicole gradually intensified as it became more symmetrical in appearance, and at 18:00 UTC on October 6, it was upgraded to a Category 1 hurricane about 345 mi (555 km) south of Bermuda. A period of rapid intensification brought Nicole to its initial peak intensity as a Category 2 hurricane early on October 7, with sustained winds of 105 mph (169 km/h) and a minimum pressure of 968 mbar (28.6 inHg). At the same time, a pinhole eye became evident on satellite imagery. Considering the strong shear produced by outflow from powerful Hurricane Matthew to Nicole's southwest, the NHC described this strengthening trend as "unexpected". An approaching trough eroded the ridge to the north, leaving the hurricane in an area of very weak steering currents; consequently, its forward movement slowed to nearly stationary.

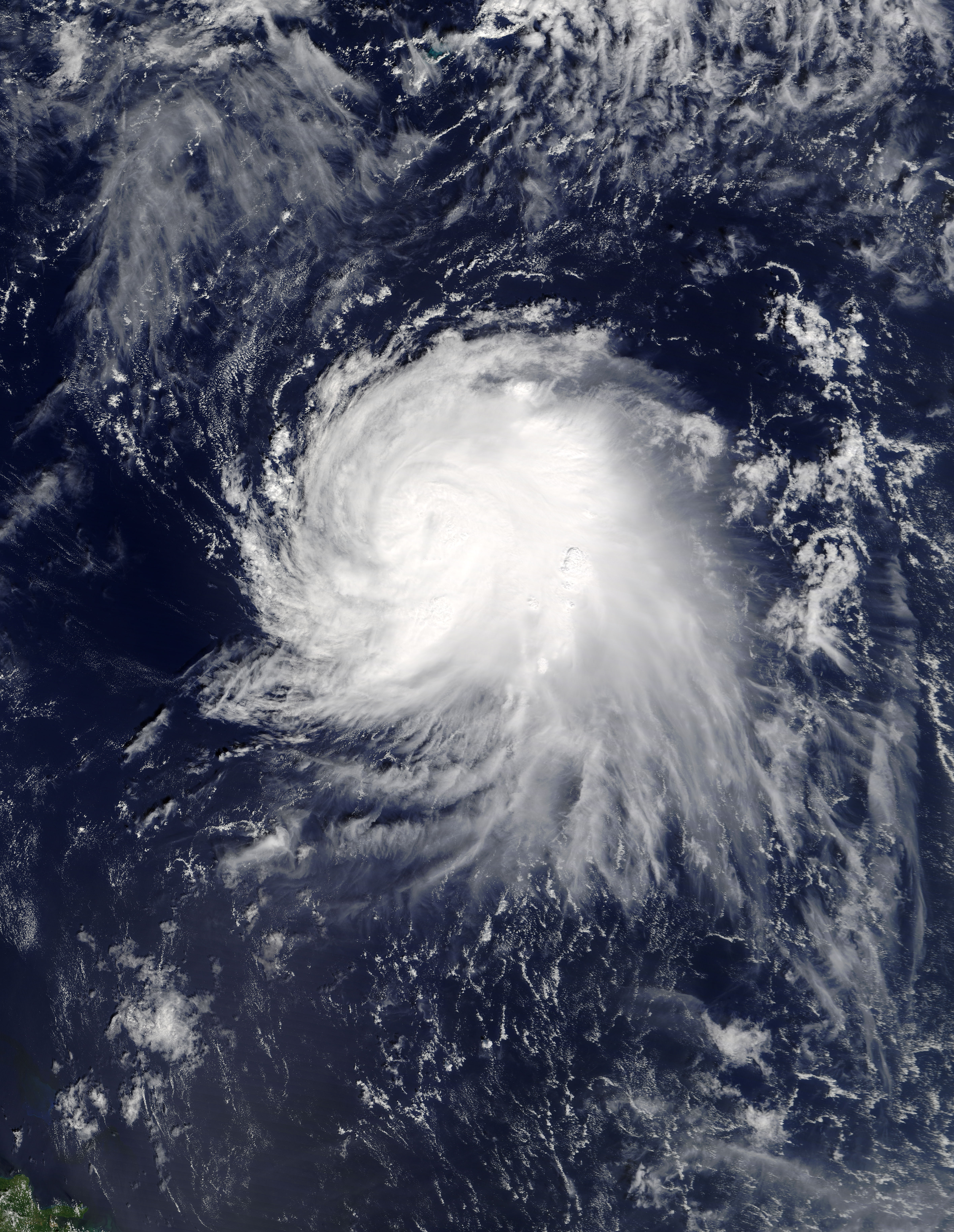
Nicole shortly before attaining hurricane status on October 6

By early on October 7, Nicole had finally felt the effects of strong wind shear and quickly weakened back into a tropical storm. A new blocking high pressure area began forming to the north, driving Nicole slowly toward the south as the storm's convective pattern continued to deteriorate. On the morning of October 8, the storm's center was displaced far to the north of the waning deep convection, and Nicole further declined to a minimal tropical storm. However, later that day, unusually warm sea surface temperatures enabled a "tremendous burst of deep convection" close to the center, and Nicole began to reintensify. That the storm was able to survive in spite of as much as 50 mph (80 km/h) of northerly shear proved "puzzling" to forecasters. Convection oscillated in coverage and intensity throughout the day on October 9; bursts of deep convection, which at one point coalesced into a burgeoning central dense overcast, repeatedly subsided to leave the center exposed. As steering currents slackened, Nicole slowed to a drift before the retreating ridge of high pressure allowed the storm to resume a northward course. By the morning of October 10, thunderstorms associated with the tropical storm had "faded away into a shallow and shapeless cloud mass," according to one NHC forecaster. The storm remained disorganized for the next day or so, until several bands of convection began to wrap around a ragged eye feature in response to abating wind shear. Nicole reattained Category 1 hurricane intensity at 18:00 UTC on October 11, and its satellite appearance continued to improve.

After meandering westward for a time, the hurricane turned north and soon accelerated toward the northeast as it recurved into the mid-latitude westerlies. While nearing Bermuda, Nicole exhibited a highly symmetrical cloud pattern centered around a large and well-defined eye. The storm underwent another period of rapid intensification, and early on October 13, reached its peak intensity as a Category 4 hurricane with winds of 140 mph (230 km/h) and a minimum pressure of 950 mbar (28 inHg). Shortly thereafter, however, increased vertical wind shear caused Nicole to weaken to a Category 3 hurricane. Between 14:00 and 15:00 UTC, the western part of the eye of Nicole passed over Bermuda, marking a direct hit, although the exact center of the eye remained just to the east. While passing the islands, the storm's inner core lost some of its structure, and the eye as viewed from radar was tilted to the southwest of the central clearing displayed on satellite. At 09:00 UTC on October 14, southwesterly wind shear reduced the system to Category 1 status, although swells from Nicole affected Bermuda and portions of the U.S. east coast and Atlantic Canada. This strengthening was due to Nicole undergoing a warm seclusion, where a cyclone's warm core is isolated from surrounding cold air, allowing it to intensify. Shortly after, Nicole slowed tremendously, as it became stationed south of a high pressure system. Its wind field started to expand drastically, and Nicole finally transitioned into an extratropical cyclone on October 18, ending its nearly 2-week journey across the Atlantic basin.

== Preparations and impact ==
=== Bermuda ===
Rainbow infrared satellite loop of Nicole making its closest approach to Bermuda October 13

On October 10, while the storm was still located about 415 mi (670 km) to the south, the Bermuda Weather Service issued a hurricane watch for the islands of Bermuda. A concurrent tropical storm warning was posted early the next morning, and both advisories were replaced with a hurricane warning when Nicole reintensified into a hurricane. Residents boarded up their homes and businesses and placed sandbags to minimize the effects of flooding. Small boats were removed from marinas for safe storage, while larger vessels that remained in the water were tightly secured. Schools and government offices closed for the duration of the storm, while ferry and bus services were suspended on October 12. Additionally, commercial flights to and from L.F. Wade International Airport were cancelled. The threat of the storm prompted three cruise liners to cancel their scheduled stops at Bermuda.

As a precaution, officials closed the Causeway late on October 12. Some 140 Royal Bermuda Regiment soldiers were deployed at strategic points, ready to assist in the aftermath of the storm. At the Cedarbridge Academy, a government shelter was opened with cots and emergency supplies for storm victims. Bermuda's only daily newspaper, The Royal Gazette, did not go to print on October 13. With adverse weather conditions expected to impact a crucial NASA rocket tracking site in Bermuda, the launch of an International Space Station resupply spacecraft from Virginia's Wallops Flight Facility was postponed. The mission had already been delayed, in part due to the threat of Hurricane Matthew.

Strong swells from the slow-moving storm started affecting Bermuda on October 6. Later, on October 11, gusty winds along the periphery of Nicole's circulation caused a brief power outage. As the core of the hurricane passed over Bermuda, a weather station on Pearl Island recorded sustained winds of 87 mph (140 km/h) with gusts to 119 mph (192 km/h). An elevated station at Commissioner's Point recorded slightly higher winds. Nicole also dropped extremely heavy rainfall, amounting to 6.77 in (172 mm).

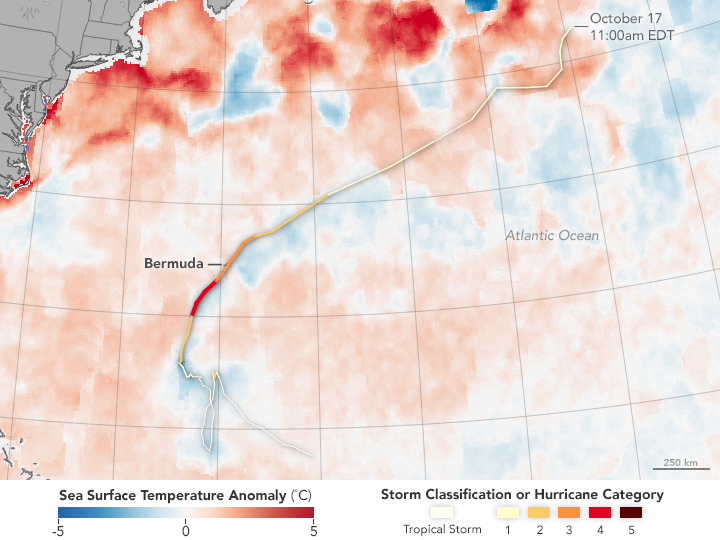
A map of sea surface temperature anomalies along the track of Hurricane Nicole. The hurricane's winds upwelled cooler waters below the surface, leaving behind a cold wake along its path.

The strong winds brought down trees and powerlines, leaving 27,341 households—approximately 90% of all electric customers in the territory—without service. Service was predominately restored within a few days, though isolated outages reappeared well after the storm's passage, when salt deposits began disrupting the electric power distribution system. The terminal building at L.F. Wade International Airport was partially unroofed, and rainwater leaks were reported throughout the facility. Agriculture took a significant hit, as the storm destroyed fields of fruit and vegetable crops in various stages of growth. At least one farmer reported a nearly total loss of young vegetable plants. Dozens of boats, some up to 80 ft (24 m) in length, were ripped from their moorings and left damaged, sunken, or crushed upon rocky sections of coastline. Low-lying roadways and buildings were flooded, and some homes sustained roof damage, but the hurricane proved less destructive than initially feared. No fatalities or serious injuries were reported, although seven individuals were hospitalized with minor weather-related injuries. An unusually high number of blackpoll warblers were spotted in Bermuda after Hurricane Nicole disrupted their transoceanic migration, forcing them to seek shelter. Insured loss were counted at $15 million.

=== U.S. East Coast ===
Although only Bermuda was directly affected by the hurricane, Nicole's large size stirred a tremendous area of high seas. Long-period swells propagated across the entire North Atlantic for a prolonged period. One surfer went missing in Puerto Rico in relation to these swells. Along the Florida coastline, hundreds of baby sea turtles were washed back ashore; roughly 500 were rescued by the Volusia Marine Science Center, and 75 by the Brevard Zoo. In South Florida, the swells combined with the annual king tide, resulting in significant coastal flooding. Water levels in Virginia Key and Miami rose 1 ft (0.30 m) above forecast levels. Coastal roads in Ft. Lauderdale became submerged with waves rolling into streets. In Rodanthe, North Carolina, a large breaking wave pulled two teenagers out to sea; one managed to swim to shore safely while the other drowned. The United States Coast Guard assisted in search and rescue for nearly two days before the boy's body washed ashore. Between 20 and 30 other people required rescue from rip currents in the area.

== See also ==
- List of Bermuda hurricanes
- List of Category 4 Atlantic hurricanes
- Hurricane Dean (1989) – struck Bermuda as a Category 2 hurricane
- Hurricane Fabian (2003) – the last major hurricane to strike Bermuda prior to Nicole
- Hurricanes Fay and Gonzalo (2014) – two hurricanes that both made landfall in Bermuda in a span of one week in October 2014
- Hurricane Paulette (2020) – another hurricane which made landfall in Bermuda four years later
