= Hurricane Fay =

Category 1 Atlantic hurricane in 2014

- Fay at peak intensity over Bermuda on October 12

Meteorological history
- Formed: October 10, 2014
- Dissipated: October 13, 2014

Category 1 hurricane
- 1-minute sustained (SSHWS/NWS)
- Highest winds: 80 mph (130 km/h)
- Lowest pressure: 983 mbar (hPa); 29.03 inHg

Overall effects
- Fatalities: None
- Damage: ≥$3.8 million (2014 USD)
- Areas affected: Bermuda
- IBTrACS
- Part of the 2014 Atlantic hurricane season

Hurricane Fay was the first hurricane to make landfall on Bermuda since Emily in 1987. (Note: A landfall occurs when the precise center of a storm crosses a coastline.) The sixth named storm and fifth hurricane of the 2014 Atlantic hurricane season, Fay evolved from a broad disturbance several hundred miles northeast of the Lesser Antilles on October 10. Initially a subtropical cyclone with an expansive wind field and asymmetrical cloud field, the storm gradually attained tropical characteristics as it turned north, transitioning into a tropical storm early on October 11.

Despite being plagued by disruptive wind shear for most of its lifetime, Tropical Storm Fay steadily intensified. Veering toward the east, Fay briefly achieved Category 1 hurricane status while making landfall on Bermuda early on October 12. Wind shear eventually took its toll on Fay, causing the hurricane to weaken to a tropical storm later that day and degenerate into an open trough early on October 13.

A few tropical cyclone warnings and watches were issued in anticipation of Fay's impact on Bermuda. Despite its modest strength, Fay produced extensive damage on Bermuda. Winds gusting over 100 mph (155 km/h) clogged roadways with downed trees and utility poles, and left a majority of the island's electric customers without power. The terminal building at L.F. Wade International Airport was flooded after the storm damaged its roof and sprinkler system. Along the coast, the storm unmoored and destroyed numerous boats. Immediately after the hurricane, 200 Bermuda Regiment soldiers were called to clear debris and assist in initial damage repairs. Cleanup efforts overlapped with preparations for the approach of the stronger Hurricane Gonzalo, which struck the island less than six days later and compounded the damage. Fay and Gonzalo marked the first recorded instance of two Bermuda hurricane landfalls in one season.

== Meteorological history ==
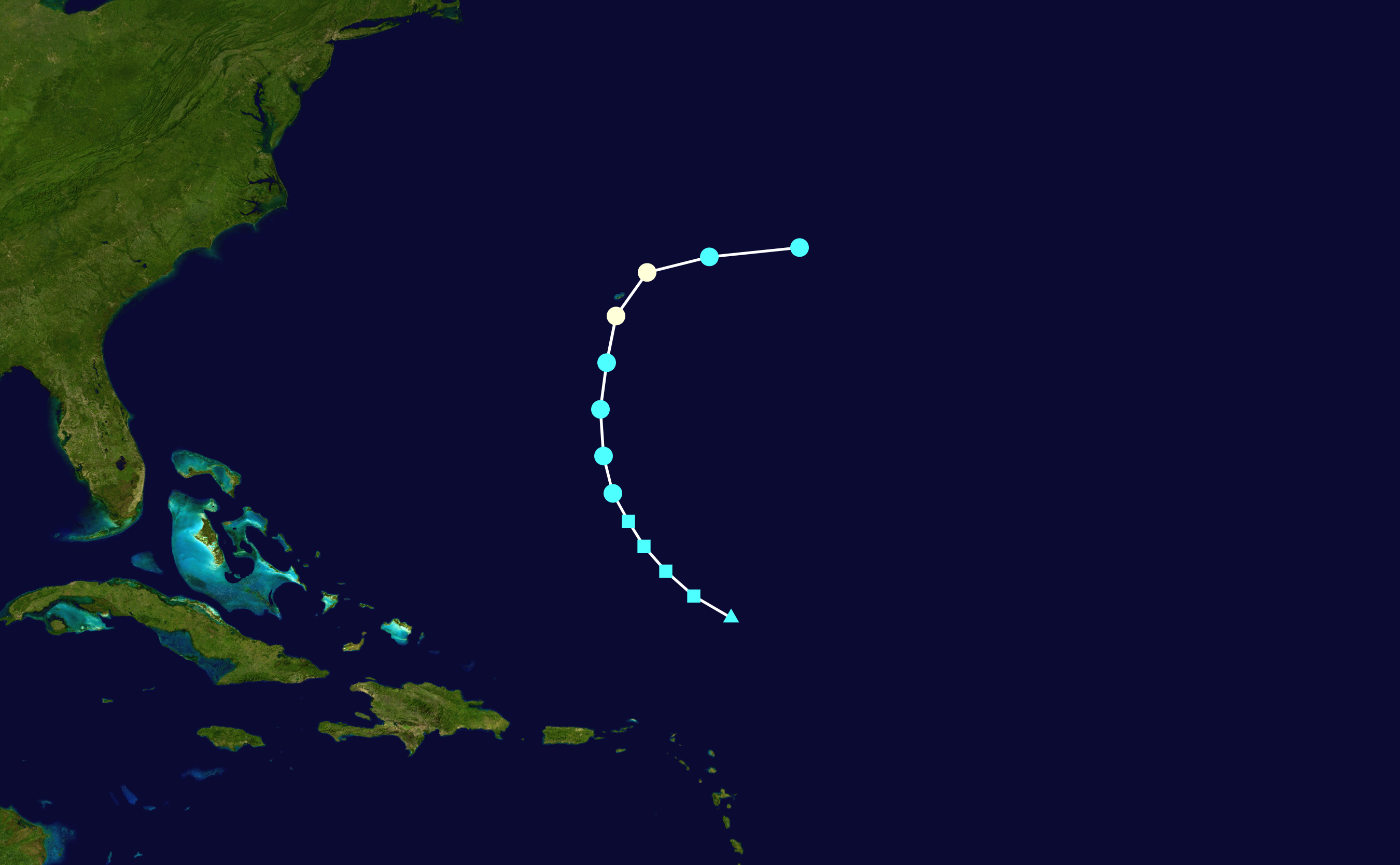
Map plotting the storm's track and intensity, according to the Saffir–Simpson scale Map key Saffir–Simpson scale Tropical depression (≤38 mph, ≤62 km/h) Tropical storm (39–73 mph, 63–118 km/h) Category 1 (74–95 mph, 119–153 km/h) Category 2 (96–110 mph, 154–177 km/h) Category 3 (111–129 mph, 178–208 km/h) Category 4 (130–156 mph, 209–251 km/h) Category 5 (≥157 mph, ≥252 km/h) Unknown Storm type Tropical cyclone Subtropical cyclone Extratropical cyclone, remnant low, tropical disturbance, or monsoon depression

Hurricane Fay originated in a disturbance calved from a mid- to upper-level trough over the east-central Atlantic. On October 7, a broad region of showers and thunderstorms formed around it, possibly enhanced by moisture from a tropical wave to the south. Tracking westward, the energy coalesced into an upper-level cold-core low on the following day, and an associated trough formed at the surface. Southwesterly wind shear initially hindered development, but as the system became more vertically aligned on October 9, the hostile winds calmed. In turn, a curved banding feature was able to take form. Early on October 10, satellite imagery indicated that the center of circulation had become better-defined, with a swath of deep convection to the north and west of the low. It became a subtropical storm at 06:00 UTC on October 10, though it was not named "Fay" until later that day, after initially being classified Subtropical Depression Seven. Its involvement with the upper-level low and wide radius of maximum winds precluded designation as a fully tropical cyclone.

Fay as a subtropical storm on October 10

Immediately after forming, the storm moved northwestward around the periphery of a ridge of high pressure in the central Atlantic. As Fay moved away from its parent upper low, wind shear once again increased. The National Hurricane Center originally expected the cyclone to remain weak, but Fay began organizing more quickly than anticipated. Relatively strong winds sampled by a Hurricane Hunters aircraft necessitated a special off-hour advisory to raise the cyclone's intensity estimate. The storm started to acquire characteristics of a fully tropical system, and despite strong southerly wind shear preventing thunderstorms from developing near the center, Fay's wind speeds steadily increased. Upper-level air divergence from the nearby non-tropical low may have contributed to the storm's resilience. After convection became more symmetrical and the wind field contracted, Fay transitioned into a tropical storm at 06:00 UTC on October 11. At the same time, the system turned toward the north around the central Atlantic ridge, soon gaining an easterly component to its movement. Fay remained heavily sheared, with the deepest convection still displaced from the center.

Forecasters originally believed Fay to have only briefly been a hurricane, but post-season reanalysis revealed that the system had actually strengthened into a Category 1 hurricane by early on October 12 and maintained that strength for 12 hours. The upgrade was confirmed by buoy and land observations and weather radar data. At 08:10 UTC, the cyclone made landfall on Bermuda with maximum sustained winds of 80 mph (130 km/h), the hurricane's peak intensity. Fay was the first hurricane to make landfall on the island since Emily in 1987. Its satellite presentation improved as a mid-level eye feature formed, though the system remained lopsided. Fay then accelerated toward the east-northeast ahead of a shortwave trough to the north, which also acted to further enhance shear in the area. The hurricane finally succumbed to the persistent wind shear when the low-level center decoupled from the mid-level low and became elongated. By the early morning hours of October 13, Fay started transitioning into an extratropical cyclone as it entered a baroclinic environment and ingested colder, drier air. The circulation rapidly deteriorated; consequently, the NHC issued its last operational advisory on the system at 21:00 UTC on October 12. Early the following day, the storm degenerated into an open trough, ending its existence as a tropical cyclone. Shortly after, the system became reestablished as a frontal cyclone, which lost its definition over the northeastern Atlantic on October 15.

== Preparations and impact ==
In advance of Fay, a tropical storm watch was issued on October 10 and upgraded to a tropical storm warning the next day. Additionally, in response to the storm's unexpected strengthening, a hurricane watch was posted at 21:00 UTC on October 11. As it was a Sunday, all public schools on the island were closed. Bus and ferry services were canceled, and two cruise ships delayed their arrival into port to avoid the cyclone.

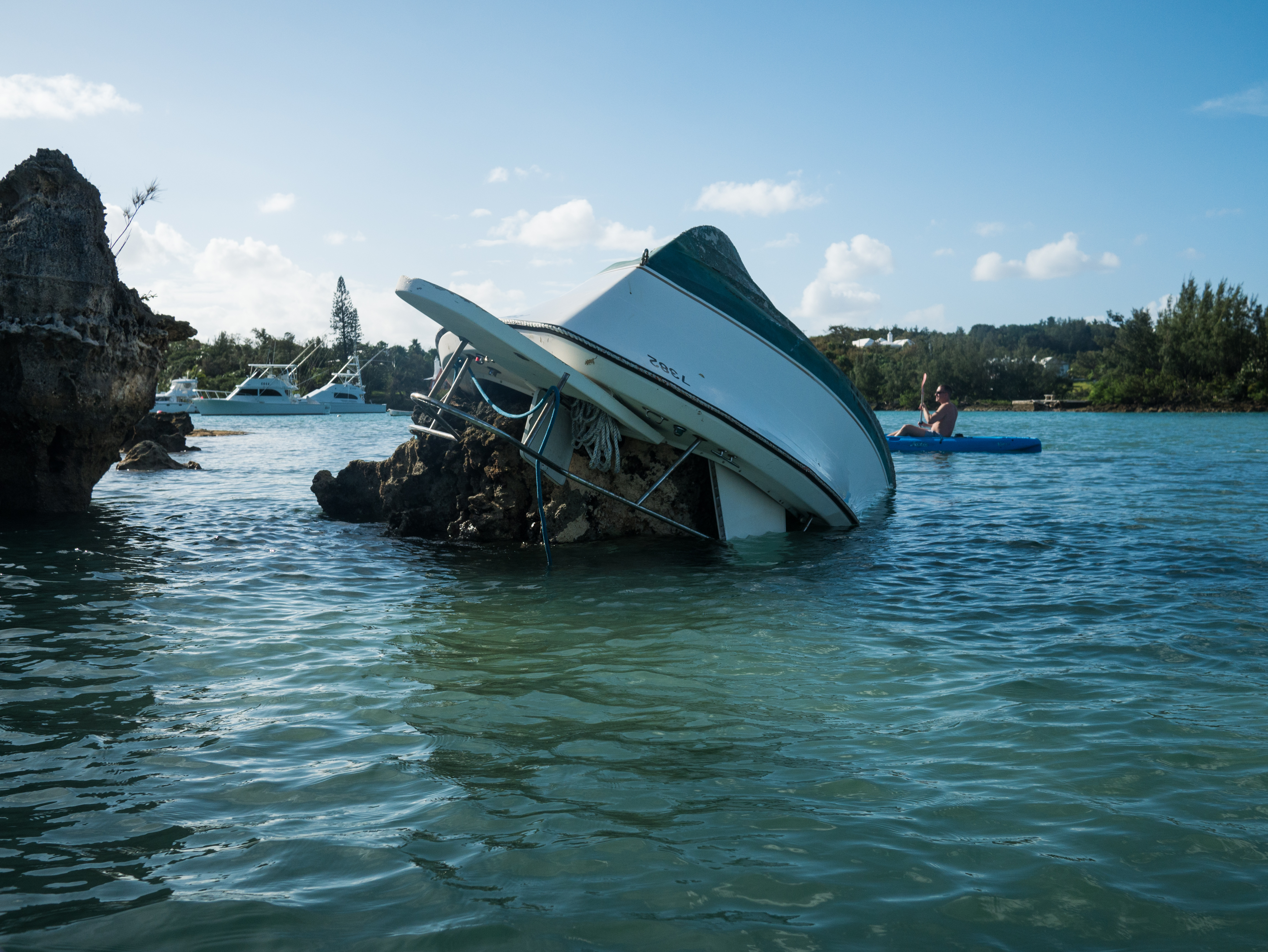
One of numerous yachts wrecked by Hurricane Fay

Fay produced unexpectedly strong winds across Bermuda, especially over western and southern parts of the territory. L.F. Wade International Airport reported 10-minute sustained winds of 61 mph (98 km/h), with gusts to 82 mph (132 km/h). Several stations at higher elevations recorded gusts in excess of 115 mph (185 km/h), reaching 123 mph (198 km/h) at Commissioner's Point, about 150 ft (46 m) above sea level. The most intense winds occurred in a relatively quick burst on the backside of the storm, within a large band of thunderstorms that affected the island a couple hours after the official landfall. Local radar imagery indicated possible tornadic activity coinciding with the period of most damaging winds, though this could also have been an artifact of radar velocity folding. A gauge at St. George's recorded a 1.78 ft (0.54 m) storm surge, though higher water rises may have affected the southern and western sides of the island. Rainfall unofficially amounted to 3.70 in (94 mm) as reported by a member of the public, and the airport recorded 1.87 in (47 mm) of rain, though the observing equipment was compromised in both cases.

The hurricane brought down thousands of trees and tree limbs, making streets impassable. The winds also toppled utility poles and inflicted roof damage on buildings. Over 27,000 of the Bermuda Electric Light Company's 36,000 customers lost power at the height of the storm. Several roads, including Front Street in Hamilton, were flooded. Many boats up to 60 ft (18 m) in length broke free from their moorings and were damaged or destroyed upon being driven aground. Hamilton city parks sustained considerable damage, and were closed due to safety hazards. The combined effects of Fay and Gonzalo forced the Botanical Gardens and Arboretum to stay closed until mid-November, while cleanup of vegetation damage was underway.

Fay damaged the roof of the airport's terminal building, causing the sprinkler system to malfunction and inundate parts of the structure with water; the resultant flooding crippled computer systems crucial to processing passenger information. The airport's radar was also impacted by the storm. In response to the damage, the airport was closed to all flights, though it quickly reopened to emergency diversions and non-commercial flights. Including subsequent damage from Gonzalo, about $2 million was spent on airport repairs, and the storms were later cited as evidence of the need for a newer terminal in a more protected location.

Overall, the cyclone's effects were greater than anticipated, with destruction at least partially facilitated by saturated soils from nearly 14 inches (360 mm) of rain in August and above-normal precipitation in September. Farmers reported that much of their autumn and winter crops had been lost, along with a few head of livestock. Fay and Gonzalo had a significant cumulative impact on Bermuda's agriculture and fishing industries, contributing to a slight GDP decline. By about a week after Fay's landfall, a local insurance company had received nearly 400 claims resulting from the storm, accounting for $3.8 million in damage. However, with several insurers on the island, the actual damage total was likely much higher; in a report to the World Meteorological Organization, the Bermuda Weather Service speculated that all insurance claims from Fay totaled "tens of millions of dollars". (Note: The swift arrival of Gonzalo made it difficult to determine an accurate damage total for Fay alone.) Ten people suffered minor storm-related injuries, but no fatalities were attributed to the storm.

== Aftermath ==
Cleanup efforts after the storm were hastened as Hurricane Gonzalo approached from the south, amid concerns that strewn debris from Fay could become airborne and exacerbate future destruction. The unanticipated heavy damage from Fay prompted residents to prepare more thoroughly for Gonzalo, as evidenced by stores reporting an influx of customers purchasing emergency supplies. Two hundred Bermuda Regiment soldiers helped clear debris and began repairing structural damage. On October 13, crews of soldiers put tarpaulins on 30 homes with roof damage, as well as distributing another 150 tarps to homeowners.

Early on October 16, the Bermuda Electric Light Company (BELCO) switched its focus from service restoration after Fay to preparations for the onslaught of Gonzalo, leaving about 1,500 households without power. The remaining affected customers were asked to refrain from calling in to report outages, as further repairs would not be attempted before Gonzalo's passage unless "an easy fix can be made [and] resources are available". With the same 1,500 customers still without electricity by October 23, BELCO tasked several crews with restoring the residual Fay outages on a priority basis, aided by Caribbean Electric Utility Services Corporation linemen who arrived in the aftermath of Gonzalo. Following the two hurricanes, service was not completely restored to the island until November 3; BELCO ultimately spent $2.9 million on system repairs, having replaced 228 utility poles and over 4 mi (6.5 km) of wire.

== See also ==
- List of Bermuda hurricanes
- Hurricane Karen (2001) – Also impacted Bermuda
- Hurricane Fabian (2003) – Most destructive hurricane in the history of Bermuda
- Hurricanes Paulette and Teddy (2020) – Two hurricanes that also impacted Bermuda within a week of each other
