= Hurricane Gonzalo =

Category 4 Atlantic hurricane in 2014

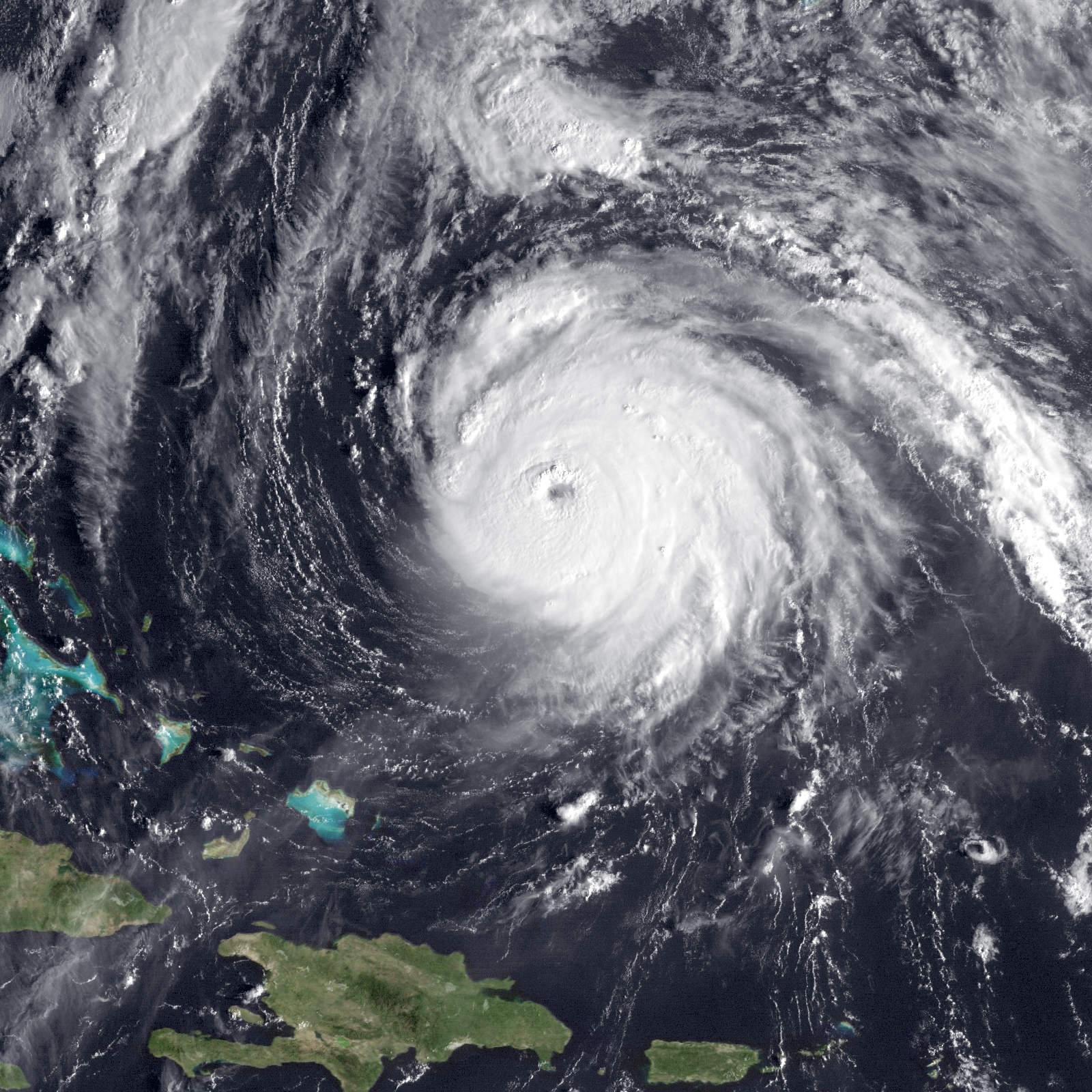
- Gonzalo at peak intensity north of the Greater Antilles on October 16

Meteorological history
- Formed: October 12, 2014
- Extratropical: October 19, 2014
- Dissipated: October 20, 2014

Category 4 major hurricane
- 1-minute sustained (SSHWS/NWS)
- Highest winds: 145 mph (230 km/h)
- Lowest pressure: 940 mbar (hPa); 27.76 inHg

Overall effects
- Fatalities: 6
- Damage: >$317 million (2014 USD)
- Areas affected: Leeward Islands, Puerto Rico, Bermuda, Newfoundland, Europe
- IBTrACS
- Part of the 2014 Atlantic hurricane season

Hurricane Gonzalo was the second tropical cyclone, after Hurricane Fay, to directly strike the island of Bermuda in a one-week time frame in October 2014, and was the first Category 4 Atlantic hurricane since Hurricane Ophelia in 2011. At the time, it was the strongest hurricane in the Atlantic since Igor in 2010. Gonzalo struck Bermuda less than a week after the surprisingly fierce Hurricane Fay; 2014 was the first season in recorded history to feature two hurricane landfalls in Bermuda. A powerful Atlantic tropical cyclone that wrought destruction in the Leeward Islands and Bermuda, Gonzalo was the seventh named storm, sixth and final hurricane and only the second major hurricane of the below-average 2014 Atlantic hurricane season. The storm formed from a tropical wave on October 12, while located east of the Lesser Antilles. It made landfall on Antigua, Saint Martin, and Anguilla as a Category 1 hurricane, causing damage on those and nearby islands. Antigua and Barbuda sustained US$40 million in losses, and boats were abundantly damaged or destroyed throughout the northern Leeward Islands. The storm killed three people on Saint Martin and Saint Barthélemy. Gonzalo tracked northwestward as it intensified into a major hurricane. Eyewall replacement cycles led to fluctuations in the hurricane's structure and intensity, but on October 16, Gonzalo peaked with maximum sustained winds of 145 mph (235 km/h).

After Hurricane Fay caused extensive power outages on the island just days before, residents of Bermuda were forced to complete preparations for Gonzalo in haste. Banks, businesses, schools, and government offices closed in advance of the storm, while the Royal Navy ship HMS Argyll left its post in the Caribbean to provide Bermuda with emergency assistance. The cyclone gradually weakened before crossing directly over central Bermuda at Category 2 strength around 00:30 UTC on October 18. Gonzalo battered the island with wind gusts as high as 144 mph (232 km/h), downing hundreds of trees and creating widespread roof damage. At the height of the storm, about 31,000 out of 36,000 total electricity customers were without power; service was not fully restored until early November. Many roads were impassable immediately following the hurricane, and in many cases, the damage done by Gonzalo was indistinguishable from that of Fay. Bermuda Regiment soldiers and sailors from the Argyll took part in initial cleanup and repairs on the territory, and preliminary assessments revealed that the storm did not compare to the devastation of Hurricane Fabian in 2003. Catastrophe modelling firms estimated that Bermuda suffered at least $200 million in insured losses, and despite the heavy disruptions, no deaths or serious injuries were reported there.

Departing Bermuda, Gonzalo accelerated toward the waters of the North Atlantic, passing close to southeastern Newfoundland before becoming extratropical on October 19. Gusty winds and bands of heavy rain in the southeastern Avalon Peninsula engendered minor flooding and power outages. A large storm system involving the remnants of Gonzalo battered the British Isles and central Europe on October 21, killing three people in the United Kingdom and severely hindering transportation. The system later played a role in triggering torrential rains over the Balkans, which resulted in severe flooding in Greece and Bulgaria.

== Meteorological history ==
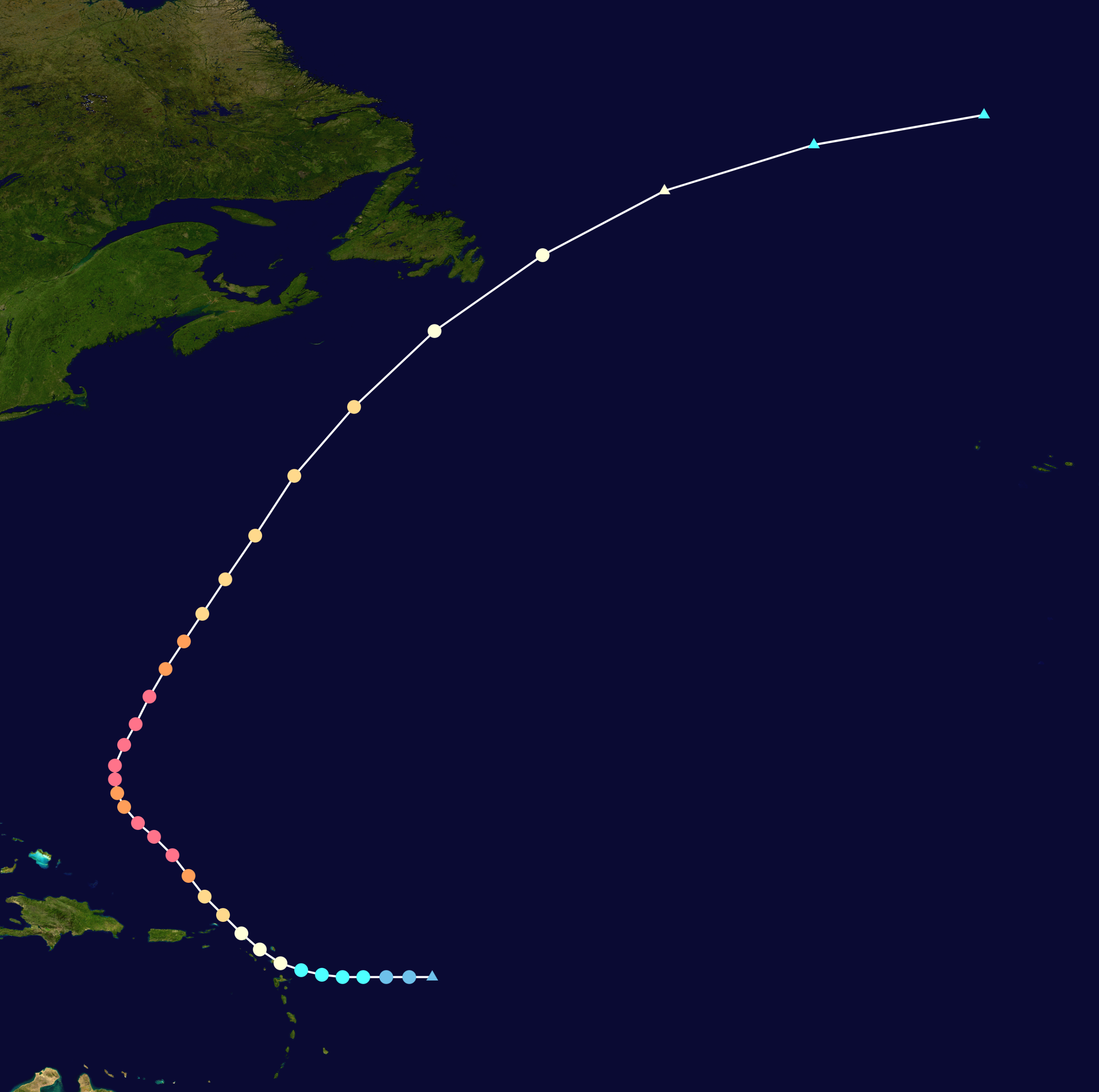
Map plotting the storm's track and intensity, according to the Saffir–Simpson scale Map key Saffir–Simpson scale Tropical depression (≤38 mph, ≤62 km/h) Tropical storm (39–73 mph, 63–118 km/h) Category 1 (74–95 mph, 119–153 km/h) Category 2 (96–110 mph, 154–177 km/h) Category 3 (111–129 mph, 178–208 km/h) Category 4 (130–156 mph, 209–251 km/h) Category 5 (≥157 mph, ≥252 km/h) Unknown Storm type Tropical cyclone Subtropical cyclone Extratropical cyclone, remnant low, tropical disturbance, or monsoon depression

Hurricane Gonzalo originated from a tropical wave that emerged from the western coast of Africa on October 4 and trekked across the Atlantic. Despite an attendant expanse of clouds and thunderstorms, hostile winds from an upper-level trough hindered cyclogenesis. On October 10, after encountering an eastward-propagating Kelvin wave, the system developed more concentrated convection. With conditions increasingly favorable for further development, the disturbance gradually became better organized, forming a small low-pressure area by October 11. In turn, a tropical depression formed at 00:00 UTC on October 12, located approximately 390 mi (630 km) east of the Leeward Islands. Continued maturation amid warm waters and low wind shear yielded Tropical Storm Gonzalo 12 hours later. Operationally, the National Hurricane Center (NHC) did not begin issuing advisories on the cyclone until midday on October 12, after a Hurricane Hunter flight into the system reported surface winds of 40 mph (65 km/h).

A powerful ridge over the central Atlantic steered the nascent storm westward toward the Lesser Antilles. Thunderstorm activity was strong near the center was initially somewhat disorganized and asymmetric. However, a tight inner core soon took shape, and Gonzalo began to quickly intensify throughout the day on October 12. Following the appearance of an eye feature early the next day, the storm was upgraded to a Category 1 hurricane while located near Antigua in the eastern Caribbean. Shortly thereafter, the storm passed directly over the island. The hurricane later struck Saint Martin and Anguilla, and skirted just north of the British Virgin Islands while continuing to intensify. By that time, it was headed toward the northwest around the periphery of the aforementioned ridge.

Hurricane Gonzalo approaching Bermuda on October 17

On October 14, the eye contracted to a diameter of 17 mi (27 km) and improved its satellite presentation. At 18:00 UTC, Gonzalo strengthened to a Category 3 major hurricane while located about 170 mi (275 km) north of San Juan, Puerto Rico. Six hours later it became the first Category 4 hurricane in the Atlantic basin since Hurricane Ophelia in 2011. Subsequently, a concentric eyewall structure indicated an imminent eyewall replacement cycle, with the inner feature "about as small as it can get" according to the NHC. The eyewall replacement cycle briefly disrupted the storm's core, causing Gonzalo to weaken slightly, but upon completion on the evening of October 15, the system stabilized and resumed intensification. While moving northward early the next day, Gonzalo reached its peak intensity with winds of 145 mph (235 km/h) and a barometric pressure of 940 mbar (hPa; 27.76 inHg). By evening it had turned north-northeastward, ahead of an advancing trough over the eastern United States and in the wake of the receding ridge.

From the evening of October 16 through the next morning, the hurricane experienced further internal fluctuations as it approached Bermuda from the south-southwest. Concurrently, the storm began to weaken. In particular, cloud tops around the hurricane warmed, and convection became less uniform, likely attributable to cooler waters and heightened wind shear. The hurricane was downgraded to Category 2 as the northern eyewall crossed Bermuda, and about 00:30 UTC on October 18, the center of circulation passed directly over the island, signaling an official landfall. Along with Hurricane Fay, which struck Bermuda on October 12, this represented the first recorded instance of two hurricanes making landfall on the island within the same season. Moving away from Bermuda, the hurricane continued to degrade, but showed signs of increased organization later on October 18. As Gonzalo accelerated northeastward at over 50 mph (80 km/h), it passed about 50 miles (80 km) southeast of Newfoundland's Avalon Peninsula early on October 19. In spite of sea surface temperatures below 50 °F (10 °C), the storm was able to maintain a central dense overcast and deep warm core. By 18:00 UTC, Gonzalo had finally succumbed to the cold environment and intense wind shear, completing its transition into a strong extratropical cyclone about 460 mi (740 km) northeast of Cape Race, Newfoundland. Gonzalo's remnants sped east-northeastward until a frontal boundary absorbed it on October 20, to the south-southwest of Iceland. The resultant system brought stormy weather to the British Isles and parts of mainland Europe on October 21, and later contributed to the formation of a large cut-off low.

== Preparations ==
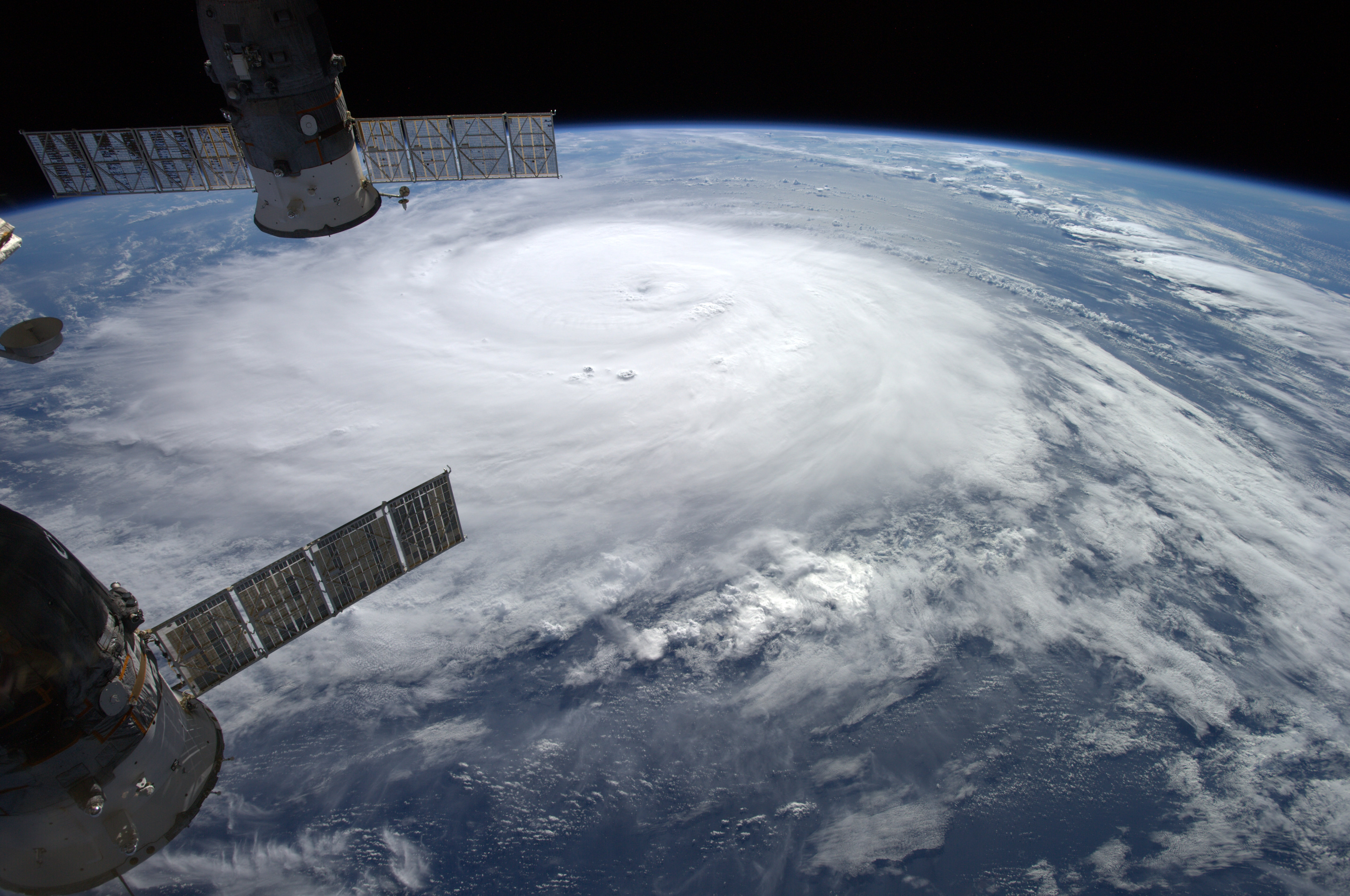
Hurricane Gonzalo approaching Bermuda on October 17, as viewed from the International Space Station

When Gonzalo first formed, various governments across the eastern Caribbean issued tropical cyclone warnings and watches, extending from Guadeloupe to the coast of Puerto Rico. As the storm was strengthening and moving through the region, a hurricane warning was issued for the British Virgin Islands, Anguilla, and Saint Martin. Several major cruise lines altered their itineraries to avoid the storm.

Late on October 14, while Gonzalo was still about 700 miles (1,125 km) to the south, the Bermuda Weather Service issued a hurricane watch for the island. The watch was upgraded to a warning the next day. Having been affected by the unexpectedly destructive Hurricane Fay just days earlier, residents quickly began preparing for Gonzalo by obtaining emergency supplies and expediting cleanup efforts from the previous storm. Premier of Bermuda Michael Dunkley advised citizens to complete most preparations by the afternoon of October 16. Banks and businesses began closing that day, while schools and government offices were closed by October 17. One school functioned as a storm shelter, and 66 people ultimately sought refuge there. Bus and ferry services were suspended on the evening of October 16. Bermuda's only daily newspaper, the Royal Gazette, did not go to print on October 17, but distributed the next day's edition for free. Bermuda Regiment soldiers were stationed at various points to support emergency response crews and ensure the safety of the public.

The Caribbean Electric Utility Services Corporation (CARILEC) sent linemen to assist the Bermuda Electric Light Company (BELCO) crews in the event of power outages from Gonzalo. Still completing restoration work after massive outages from Fay, BELCO stationed vehicles and supplies at strategic points on the island to prepare for the next hurricane. On the morning of October 16, BELCO switched its focus from Fay to Gonzalo, leaving around 1,500 households without power; the remaining affected customers were asked to refrain from calling to report outages. Ahead of the storm, the Royal Navy frigate HMS Argyll sailed from the Caribbean to provide Bermuda with emergency assistance. Public beaches were closed as hurricane swells began to build, and the decision was made to shut down the Causeway early on October 17, based on forecasts of long-duration severe winds. Additionally, L.F. Wade International Airport closed prior to the storm's onslaught, accounting for 62 canceled commercial flights. Three cruise ships were diverted from the island.

== Impact and aftermath ==
=== Caribbean ===
Infrared satellite loop of Gonzalo moving over the Leeward Islands on October 13

While moving through the northeastern Leeward Islands as a fledgling hurricane, Gonzalo produced sustained winds of 77 mph (124 km/h) on Antigua, with gusts to 90 mph (140 km/h). Roads were blocked by uprooted trees, while numerous buildings, including several schools, received significant damage. Gonzalo caused an island-wide power outage, and its storm surge damaged boats. Schools and businesses were forced to close, and four emergency shelters opened to storm victims. Debris and flooding forced V. C. Bird International Airport to delay its return to operation after closing as a precaution. Numerous homes sustained damage, largely to their roofs, with the Saint George Parish suffering the greatest losses. Farming communities and a variety of crops were severely impacted, which sparked concerns of imminent produce shortages. Some growers lost their entire banana crops.

Barbuda experienced gusts as high as 70 mph (110 km/h), as well as radar-estimated rainfall of up to 6 in (150 mm). Although Barbuda was subject to less widespread devastation than its twin island, there were still snapped tree limbs, reports of flooding, and disruptions to utility services. Damages to residences, government buildings, and agriculture on Antigua contributed to Antigua and Barbuda's national storm cost of around US$40 million, which also includes compensation to American Airlines for not meeting departing passenger quotas during the hurricane. Numerous individuals were treated for minor storm-related injuries, none of them life-threatening. Further west, Gonzalo caused minor power outages on Saint Kitts and Nevis, while a general 1–2 in (25–51 mm) of rain accompanied wind gusts to 58 mph (93 km/h) on Guadeloupe.

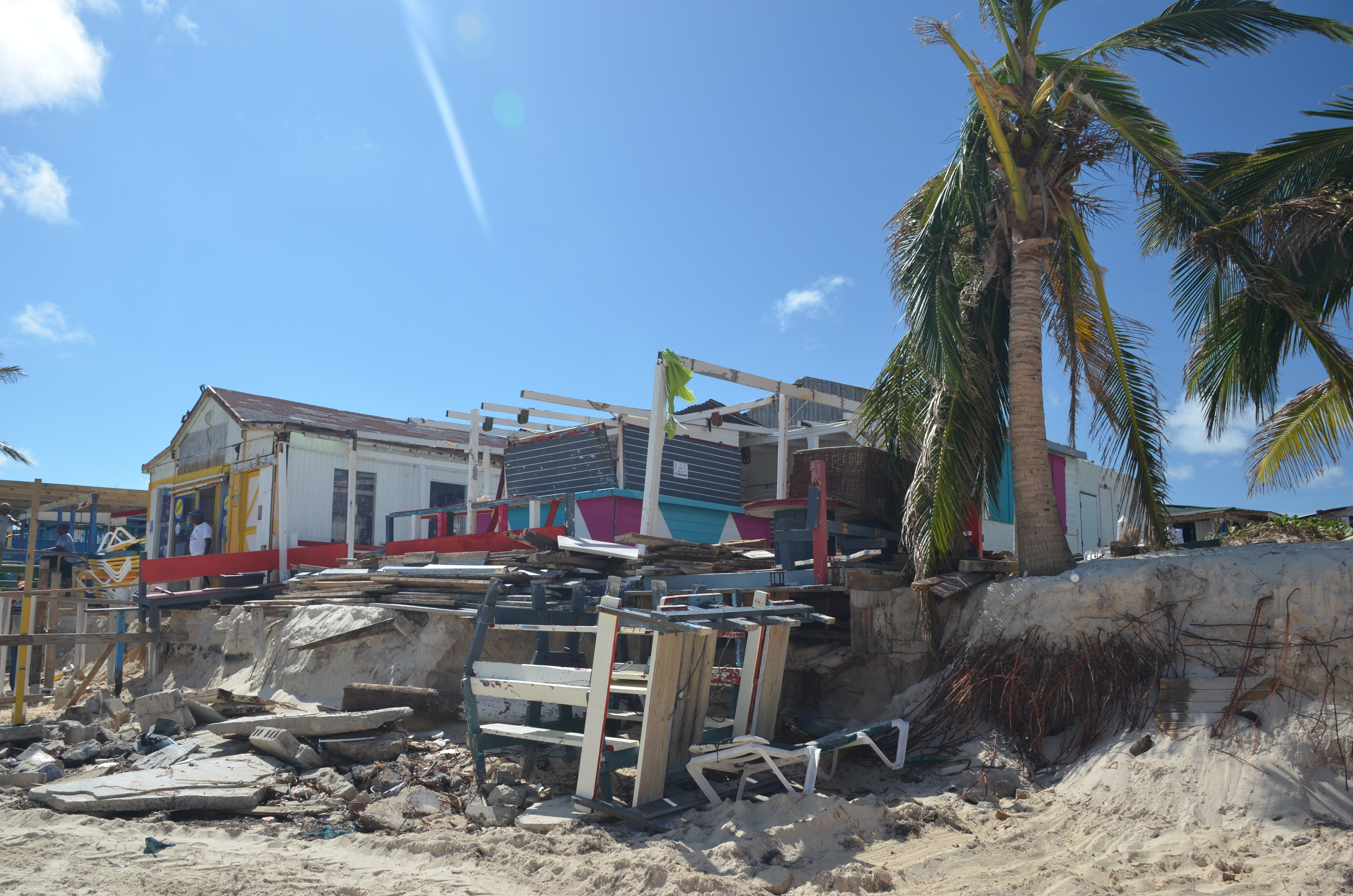
Damage to coastal installations at Orient Beach on Saint Martin

The storm wrecked dozens of boats around Saint Martin, including 22 in Simpson Bay Lagoon, and an elderly man aboard one of the stricken vessels was killed. Two people on Saint Martin and Saint Barthélemy went missing in the storm, and were presumed dead after remaining unaccounted for several months later. Fourteen other missing individuals were returned alive. Winds on Saint Barthélemy blew 86 mph (138 km/h) sustained, with gusts to 126 mph (203 km/h). Fallen trees obstructed streets, and an aircraft flipped over on a runway at Gustaf III Airport. As many as 40 boats were reportedly beached on Saint Barthélemy.

On Saint Martin, sustained winds exceeded 60 mph (95 km/h), and L'Espérance Airport recorded gusts to 93 mph (150 km/h) before the observing equipment failed. As much as 5.70 in (145 mm) of rain fell over the island. Reports of urban flooding and entrance of water into homes were common. Gonzalo impaired water and electricity services throughout Dutch Sint Marteen and inflicted significant damage to homes. The St. Maarten Zoo sustained heavy structural damage, though all resident animals survived unharmed. The French side of the island incurred relatively little destruction, with scattered roof and window damage, though Orient Beach "was a scene of complete devastation"; several businesses there suffered extensively. Emergency responders and military aircraft from Martinique were dispatched to aid in post-storm recovery on Saint Barthélemy and Saint Martin.

Heavy rain on Anguilla flooded the Clayton J. Lloyd International Airport and portions of several districts, qualifying the government for a US$500,000 "excess rainfall" insurance payout. The eastern and western ends of the island bore the brunt of the storm, facing damage to utility poles, vegetation, and roofs, and public schools did not reopen until October 20 or later. The sole hospital experienced minor flood damage.

Gonzalo produced squally weather in parts of Puerto Rico and the Virgin Islands, causing power outages and prompting 20 people to stay in an emergency shelter. Cyril E. King Airport on Saint Thomas was temporarily closed due to the storm; the airport endured blustery conditions, with gusts reaching 35 mph (56 km/h). Elsewhere, rough seas affected parts of the Greater Antilles and the Bahamas.

=== Bermuda ===
Infrared satellite loop of Gonzalo passing through Bermuda on October 18

Gonzalo generated hurricane-force winds across Bermuda over a period of about six hours, at their strongest from the northwest on the backside of the storm. Tropical storm conditions persisted for up to 24 hours. Elevated weather stations observed the highest winds; Commissioner's Point recorded 10-minute sustained winds of 109 mph (175 km/h), and St. David's measured gusts as high as 144 mph (232 km/h). Gusts reached 113 mph (182 km/h) at the Causeway, closer to sea level. The airport recorded 2.85 in (72 mm) of rain, but due to the strong winds, this was most likely an underestimation of what actually fell. The passage of the hurricane's eye was marked by diminished winds and a lack of rain, but a drizzle of ocean mist reportedly fell over the island. As Gonzalo struck at low tide, the effects of storm surge were minimal. At Esso Pier on the north side of the island, storm tides peaked at 3.25 ft (0.99 m) above normal.

The intense winds brought down utility poles and hundreds of trees (likely exacerbated by saturated ground from record rainfall in the months prior), leaving "barely a road" passable. The storm razed several invasive species, with endemic trees proving more resilient. A composting facility received 1,200 truckloads of plant debris per day after Fay and Gonzalo, up from an average of 100. Damage from the storms totaled around US$260,000 on Bermuda National Trust properties, which include nature preserves and cemeteries. Similarly, the Bermuda Botanical Gardens and Arboretum were closed due to safety hazards resulting from extensive vegetation damage.

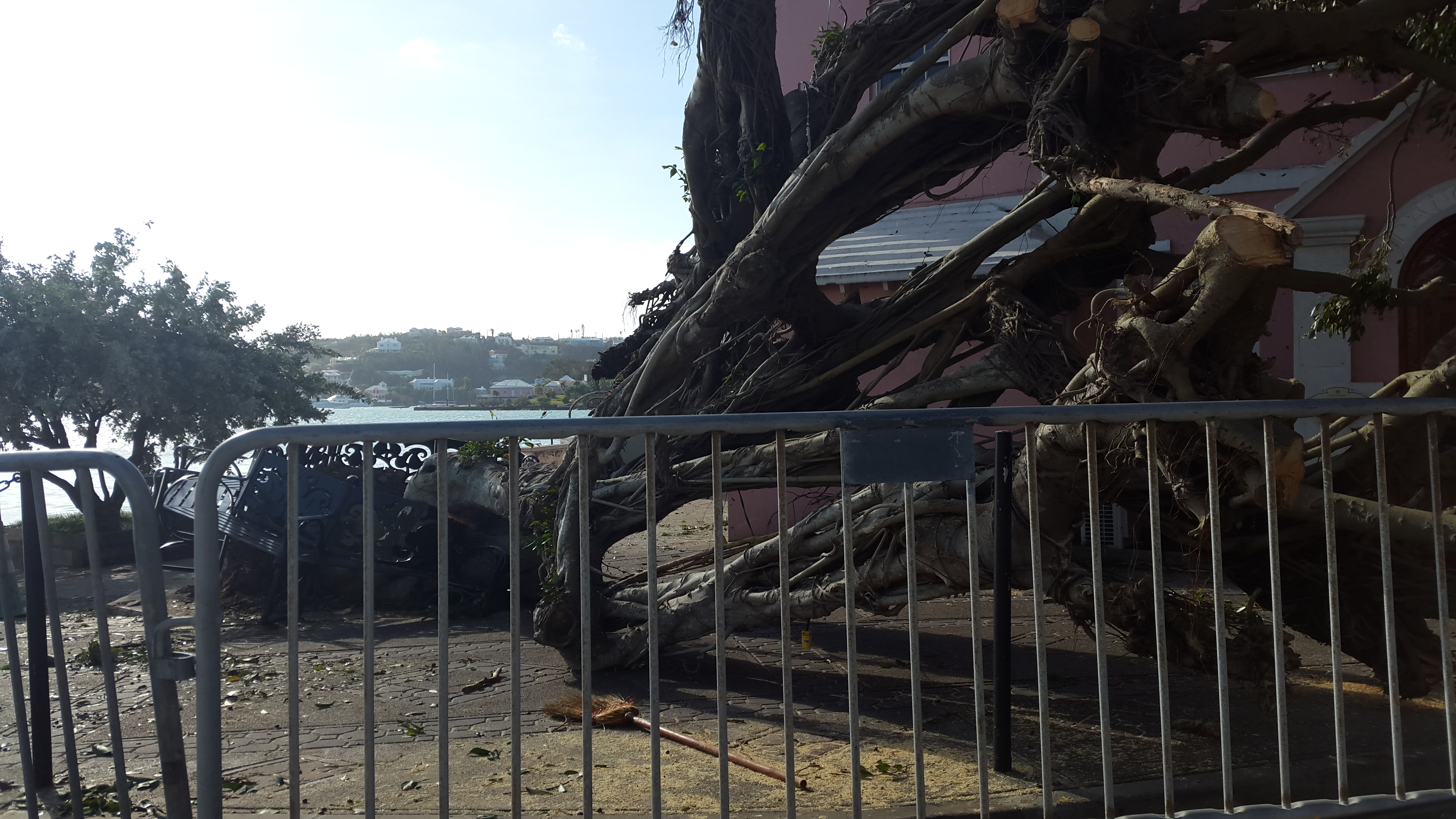
Downed trees in Hamilton, Bermuda after Gonzalo passed by

The first storm-related power outages took place in the early afternoon on October 17 as weather conditions worsened. At the height of the storm, about 31,000 out of 36,000 electricity customers were without power, including the 1,500 outages left unresolved after Fay. Backup CARILEC crews helped with specialty assignments, such as commercial outages and homes without power since before Gonzalo's onslaught. Service was not fully restored until November 3, and BELCO ultimately spent US$2.9 million on system repairs after hurricanes Fay and Gonzalo. The company replaced 228 utility poles, 80 transformers, and over four miles (6.4 km) of wire. Other utilities, such as television and Internet services, also suffered, and technicians handled individual outages deep into the month of November. About six hundred streetlights on main roads and several hundred more on side-streets were inoperative following the hurricane; some remained unmended through January 2015.

Structural damage ranged from the superficial to complete wall or roof failure, the latter being relatively uncommon. A multitude of buildings, including churches, a visitor center, the House of Assembly building in Hamilton, and the Bermuda Police Service headquarters at Prospect Camp, suffered some degree of roof damage. Older structures were particularly prone to substantial damage, as were commercial storage buildings subject to less strict building codes. In December, five new slate quarries were approved to accommodate the demand for roofing materials. Both the new and the old portions of King Edward VII Memorial Hospital received significant damage that exposed the facilities to the elements. An exhibit at the Bermuda Aquarium, Museum and Zoo was unroofed, and coastal erosion threatened to encroach on the site, though no animals were harmed. Part of the structure's roof was blown a one-quarter mile (400 m).

L.F. Wade International Airport sustained some roof and runway lighting damage, and the Bermuda Weather Service building lost a storm shutter and saw water forced inside a communications room. A restaurant at the site of the Gibbs Hill Lighthouse was severely damaged, requiring a complete roof replacement. The Causeway was largely spared, with some damage to the safety walls alongside the road, and it was partially reopened on October 18 after initial repairs. However, one of two lanes remained shut down for several days. Many boats were washed ashore and damaged or wrecked by the storm, and other vessels tipped over in boatyards. According to preliminary estimates, properties in the Dockyard alone incurred US$1 million (2014 BMD) in damage.

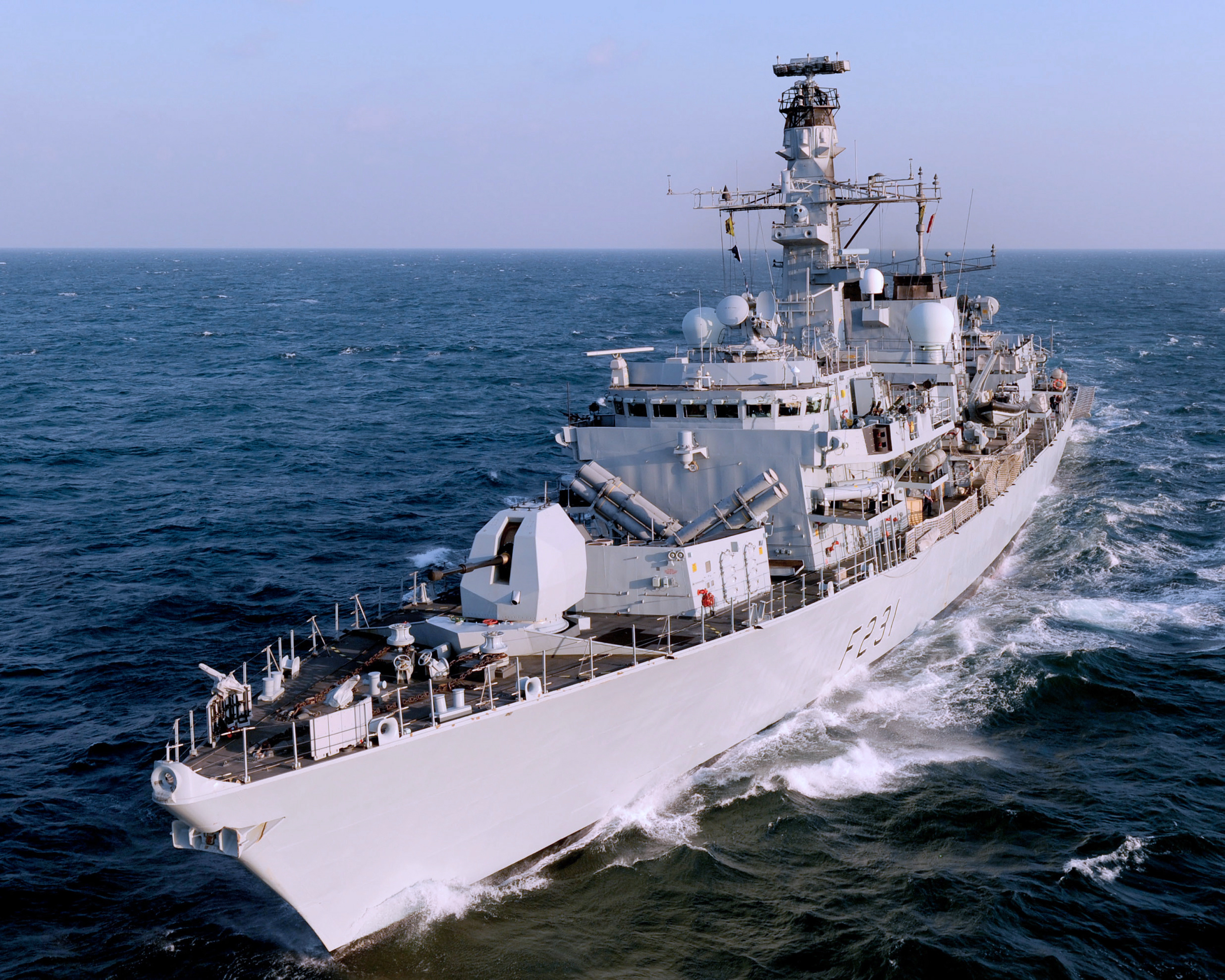
HMS Argyll traveled to Bermuda from the Caribbean to aid in recovery efforts.

The strongest hurricane to directly affect Bermuda since 2003's Hurricane Fabian, Gonzalo was generally less destructive. Damage modelling firms estimated insured losses from the hurricane to settle between US$200 million and US$400 million, not including damage to watercraft, though the CEO of the largest property insurer on Bermuda believed losses to be much lower. It was estimated that a Fabian equivalence in 2014 would cause about US$650 million in damage. Some insurance companies decided to treat Fay and Gonzalo as a single event, allowing one deductible to count toward claims from both storms. After initial assessments, Premier Dunkley reported that the territory fared "much better than we expected", and the storm was not blamed for any deaths or major injuries on Bermuda.

In the aftermath of the hurricane, a Royal Navy helicopter aboard Argyll flew out ahead of the ship to start aerial damage assessments. Members of the Bermuda Regiment immediately began cleanup and recovery efforts, while the government provided tarps to affected homeowners. Sailors from the Argyll teamed up with Regiment soldiers upon the ship's arrival to continue relief work. Some 35 of the vessel's crew worked to clear debris from the runway at the airport, which reopened on October 19 after thorough evaluations. Including damage from Fay, about $2 million was spent on airport repairs, and the storms were later cited as evidence of the need for a newer terminal in a more protected location. All schools on the territory resumed classes by October 21.

=== Atlantic Canada ===
On October 17, the Canadian Hurricane Centre issued a tropical storm watch for the Avalon Peninsula of Newfoundland, between Arnold's Cove and Chapel's Cove. Some communities, including St. John's, worked to clear debris from culverts and storm drains to minimize the effects of flooding. Outer rainbands produced up to 2.7 in (69 mm) of rain in just a few hours, which produced localized urban flooding in St. John's. Winds gusted to 66 mph (106 km/h) at Cape Pine and 55 mph (89 km/h) at Cape Race. At St. John's International Airport, sustained winds of 34 mph (55 km/h) were punctuated by gusts to 46 mph (74 km/h). The winds briefly cut power to about 100 households in a St. John's neighborhood. Offshore, a buoy over the Laurentian fan recorded peak wave heights to 68 ft (21 m), and an oil rig southeast of the storm's center experienced sustained winds of 98 mph (158 km/h). Low astronomical tides prevented significant coastal flooding, but a 2.6 ft (0.8 m) surge was recorded at both St. John's and Argentia. Farther west, the hurricane generated rough seas and rip currents along the Atlantic coast of Nova Scotia.

=== United Kingdom and Europe ===
Wettest tropical cyclones and their remnants in the United Kingdom Highest-known totals
Precipitation			Storm	Location	Ref.
Rank	mm	in	Storm	Location	Ref.
1	150.0	5.91	Bertha 2014	Inverness, Highland	
2	135.0	5.31	Charley 1986	Abergwyngregyn, Gwynedd	
3	130.0	5.12	Nadine 2012	Ravensworth, North Yorkshire	
4	76.0	2.99	Lili 1996	Chale Bay, Isle of Wight	
5	61.7	2.43	Zeta 2020	Chipping, Lancashire	
6	48.8	1.92	Grace 2009	Capel Curig, Conwy	
7	42.2	1.66	Gordon 2006	Wainfleet All Saints, Lincolnshire	
8	38.0	1.50	Gonzalo 2014	Glenmoriston, Highland	
9	31.0	1.22	Bill 2009	Shap, Cumbria	
10	30.0	1.18	Laura 2008	Windermere, Cumbria	

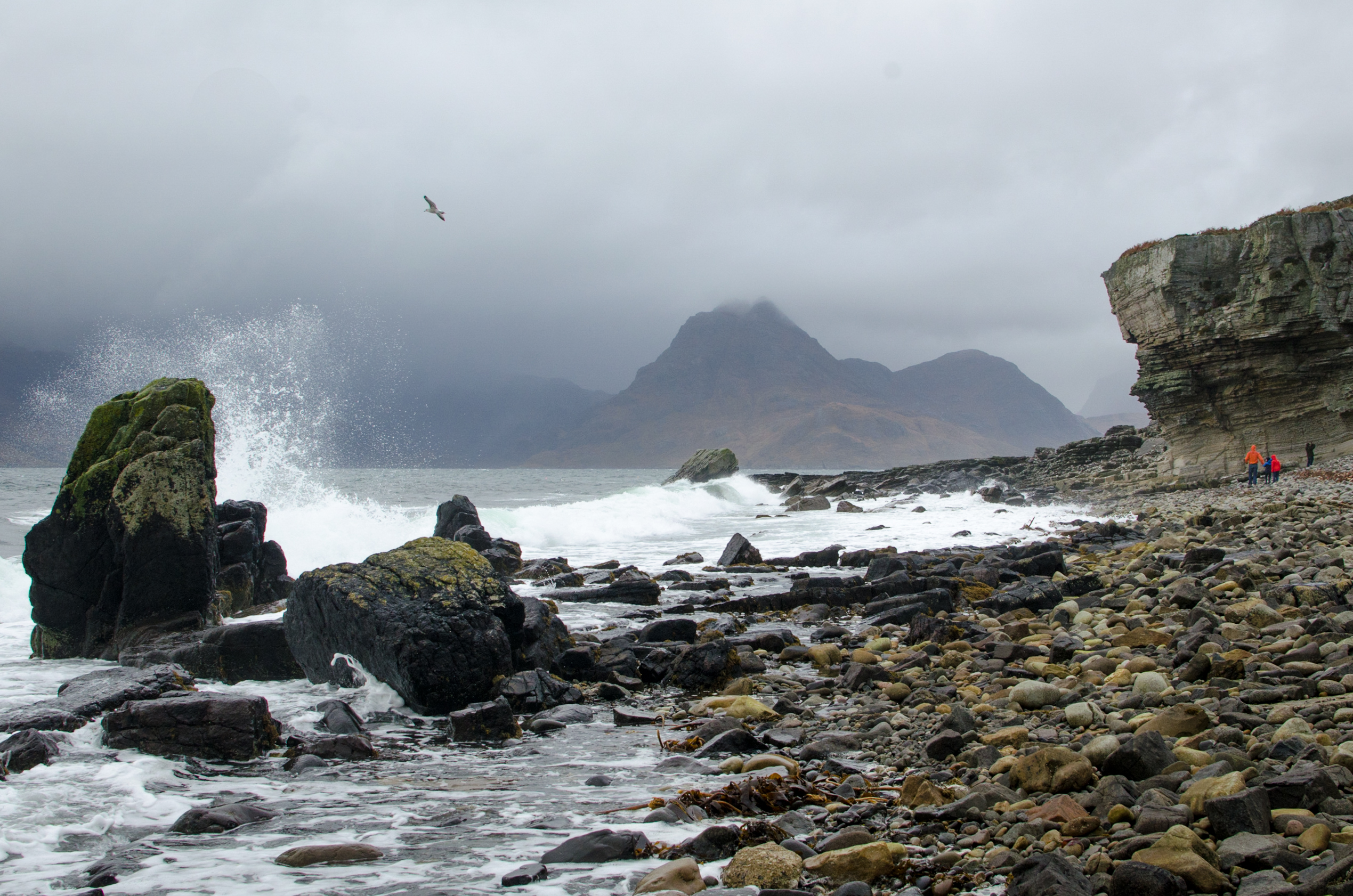
Strong waves from Gonzalo hit the coast of the Isle of Skye, Scotland.

The extratropical storm complex incorporating the remnants of Gonzalo generated strong winds across the British Isles, especially over Ireland and the northern United Kingdom. Winds gusted to 88 mph (142 km/h) at Oban in western Scotland, while gusts exceeding 60 mph (95 km/h) were common elsewhere. The system halted transportation throughout the region, forcing the cancellation of more than a hundred flights at London Heathrow Airport, grounding ferries, and blocking roads and railways with debris. Falling trees killed one woman near Hyde Park, London, and injured several others. In Essex, the winds collapsed a car jack supporting a van, fatally crushing a man working underneath. The storm triggered minor power outages in Scotland and Wales, with more extensive outages in northwestern Ireland after gusts as high as 115 km/h (71 mph).

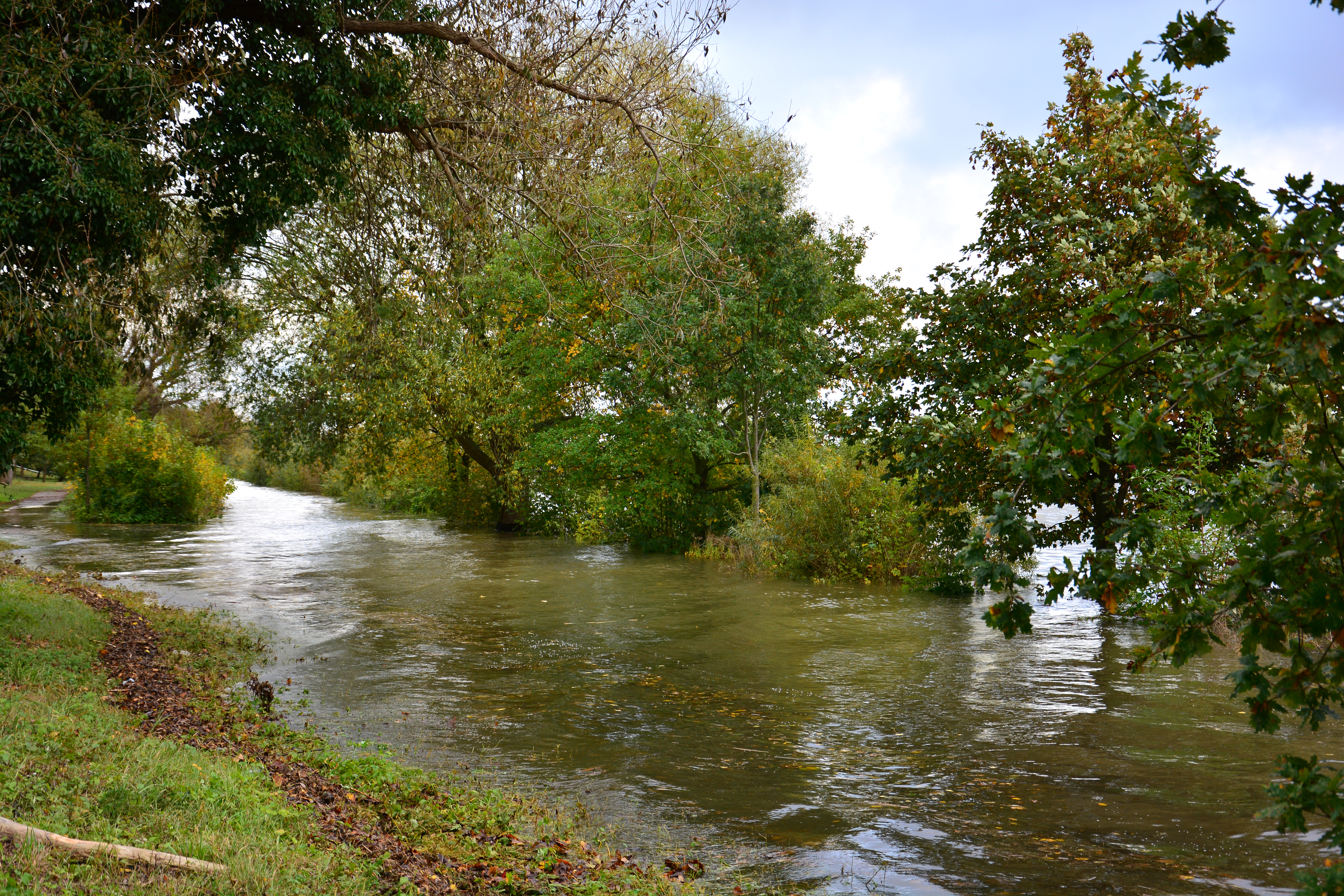
Flooding along the Elbe River in Hamburg-Rissen, Germany, on October 22

Western and central Europe were also impacted by damaging winds and downpours. The coast of the Netherlands endured high seas and gusts to 108 km/h (67 mph), uprooting trees and flooding the coastline. Rail services and flight operations were disrupted throughout the region. In Germany, gusts over 145 km/h (90 mph) were recorded at high elevations. In Stuttgart alone, fifty vehicles were damaged by falling debris; downed trees, torn roofs, and power outages were common throughout the nation. In the Bavarian capital of Munich, the storm destroyed a large tin roof measuring over 80 m^{2} (860 sq ft), parts of which impacted cars and fences on the ground. Damage from the incident was estimated at €500,000 (US$637,000). Throughout Germany, the storm wrought €60–100 million (US$80–130 million) in insured losses. A woman died in a traffic accident, attributed to wet road conditions, along the Bundesstraße 303 in the Bayreuth district. Northwesterly gales yielded a storm surge along the country's North Sea coastline, with tides running over 2 m (6 ft 7 in) above normal along the Elbe River at Hamburg. Neighboring Austria and Switzerland also experienced gales and power outages. A tornado touched down near Neukirchen an der Enknach in Austria, damaging homes and farms. Gusts in southern Switzerland reached 185 km/h (115 mph), leading to road and rail closures. In southern France, the system initiated a mistral wind event.

The upper-level low associated with the hurricane's remnants blanketed parts of the Alps with heavy snowfall, accumulating to several feet, and subsequently fueled torrential rains in the Balkans on October 24 and 25. Floodwaters caused by estimated rainfall totals nearing 150 mm (6 in) inundated entire villages in southeastern Bulgaria, forcing hundreds to evacuate, and there were widespread disruptions of power and water services. A woman in Burgas died from drowning. In the Greek capital city of Athens, the deluge filled streets with rushing water that swept away hundreds of vehicles. More than three hundred buildings were inundated in the Attica area.

== See also ==
- Other storms of the same name
- List of Bermuda hurricanes
- List of Canada hurricanes
- 1948 Bermuda–Newfoundland hurricane
- Hurricane Luis (1995) devastated the Leeward Islands in 1995 before passing west of Bermuda.
- Hurricane Georges (1998) caused extensive damage in Antigua and Barbuda.
- Hurricane Fay (2014) made landfall on Bermuda just a week prior to Gonzalo.
- Hurricanes Paulette and Teddy (2020) affected Bermuda within a week of each other.
- Hurricane Ernesto (2024) took a near-identical track to Gonzalo and made landfall on Bermuda as a Category 1 hurricane.
