= Hurricane Paulette =

Category 2 Atlantic hurricane in 2020

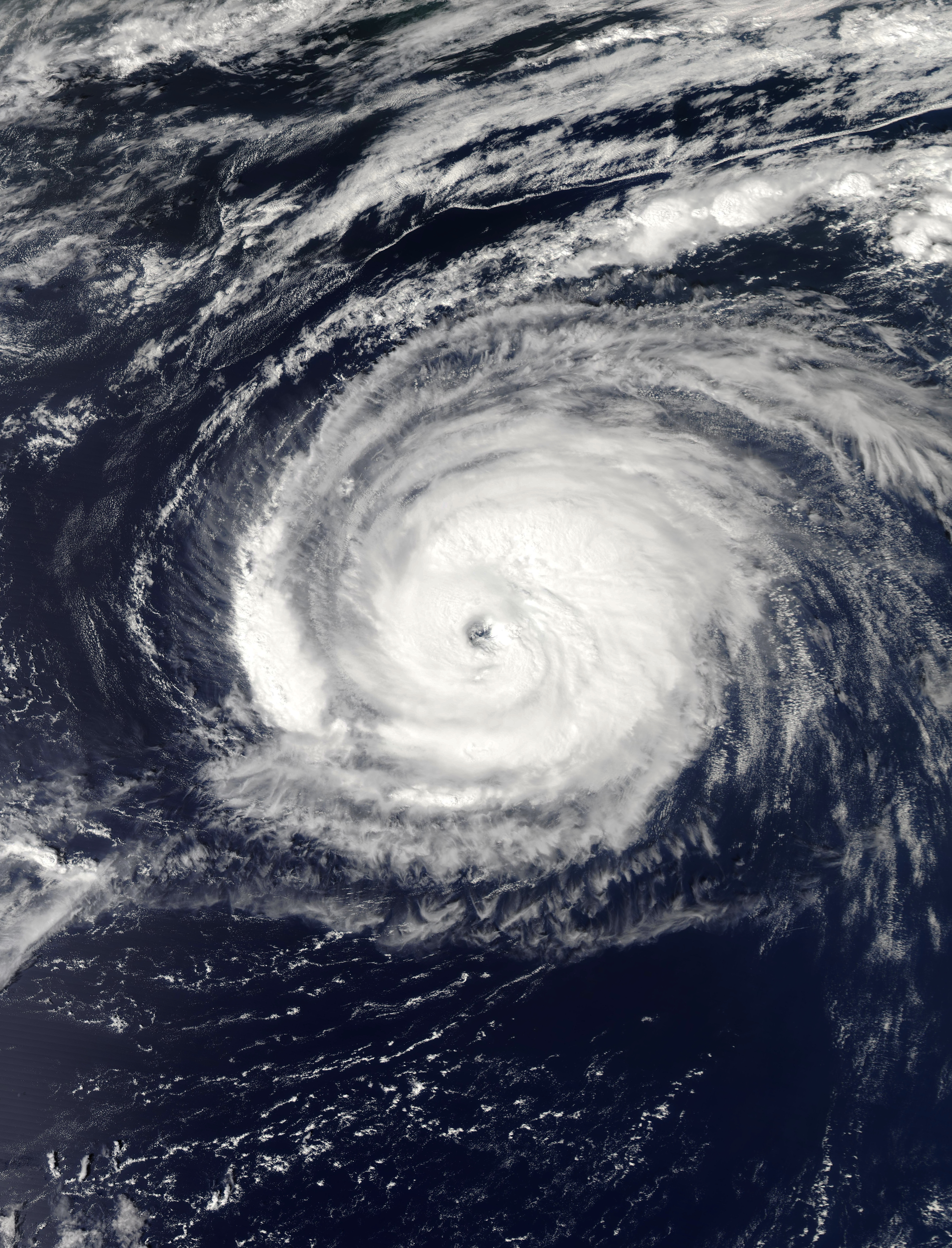
- Hurricane Paulette just before its peak intensity north of Bermuda on September 14

Meteorological history
- Formed: September 7, 2020
- Post-tropical: September 22, 2020
- Dissipated: September 28, 2020

Category 2 hurricane
- 1-minute sustained (SSHWS/NWS)
- Highest winds: 105 mph (165 km/h)
- Lowest pressure: 965 mbar (hPa); 28.50 inHg

Overall effects
- Fatalities: 2 total
- Damage: ≥$50 million (2020 USD)
- Areas affected: Cape Verde, Bermuda, East Coast of the United States, Azores, Madeira
- IBTrACS
- Part of the 2020 Atlantic hurricane season

Hurricane Paulette was a strong and long-lived tropical cyclone which became the first to make landfall in Bermuda since Hurricane Gonzalo in 2014, and was the longest-lasting tropical cyclone of 2020 globally. The sixteenth named storm and sixth hurricane of the record-breaking 2020 Atlantic hurricane season, Paulette developed from a tropical wave that left the coast of Africa on September 2. The wave eventually consolidated into a tropical depression on September 7. Paulette fluctuated in intensity over the next few days, due to strong wind shear, initially peaking as a strong tropical storm on September 8. It eventually strengthened into a hurricane early on September 13 as shear decreased. On September 14, Paulette made landfall in northeastern Bermuda as a Category 2 hurricane, while making a gradual turn to the northeast. The cyclone further strengthened as it moved away from the island, reaching its peak intensity with 1-minute sustained winds of 105 mph (169 km/h) and a minimum central atmospheric pressure of 965 mbar (28.5 inHg) on September 14. On the evening of September 15, Paulette began to weaken and undergo extratropical transition, which it completed on September 16. The hurricane's extratropical remnants persisted and moved southward then eastward, and eventually, Paulette regenerated into a tropical storm early on September 20 south of the Azores– which resulted in the U.S National Weather Service coining the phrase "zombie storm" to describe its unusual regeneration. Paulette's second phase proved short-lived, however, as the storm quickly weakened and became post-tropical again two days later. The remnant persisted for several days before dissipating south of the Azores on September 28. In total, Paulette was a tropical cyclone for 11.25 days, and the system had an overall lifespan of 21 days (3.0 weeks).

Paulette brought hurricane-force sustained winds and heavy rain to Bermuda, causing widespread power outages on the island. Paulette caused an estimated US$50 million in damage in the country. Large swells affected the East Coast of the United States, and 2 people drowned off the coasts of New Jersey and South Carolina, respectively, after getting caught in rip currents generated by the hurricane. Minimal impacts were recorded in Azores from Paulette's second stint as a tropical cyclone.

== Meteorological history ==
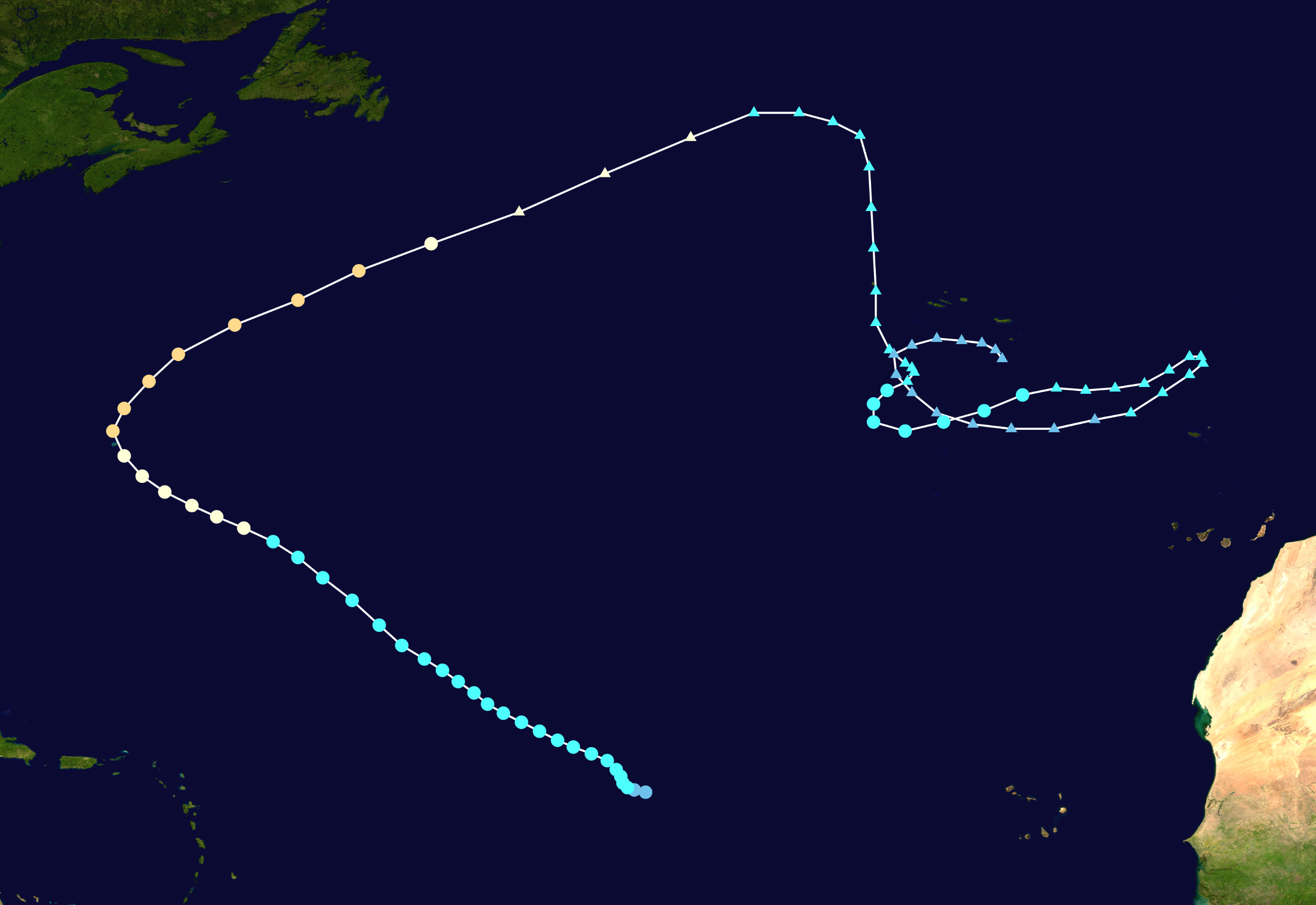
Map plotting the storm's track and intensity, according to the Saffir–Simpson scale Map key Saffir–Simpson scale Tropical depression (≤38 mph, ≤62 km/h) Tropical storm (39–73 mph, 63–118 km/h) Category 1 (74–95 mph, 119–153 km/h) Category 2 (96–110 mph, 154–177 km/h) Category 3 (111–129 mph, 178–208 km/h) Category 4 (130–156 mph, 209–251 km/h) Category 5 (≥157 mph, ≥252 km/h) Unknown Storm type Tropical cyclone Subtropical cyclone Extratropical cyclone, remnant low, tropical disturbance, or monsoon depression

=== Origins and early phase ===
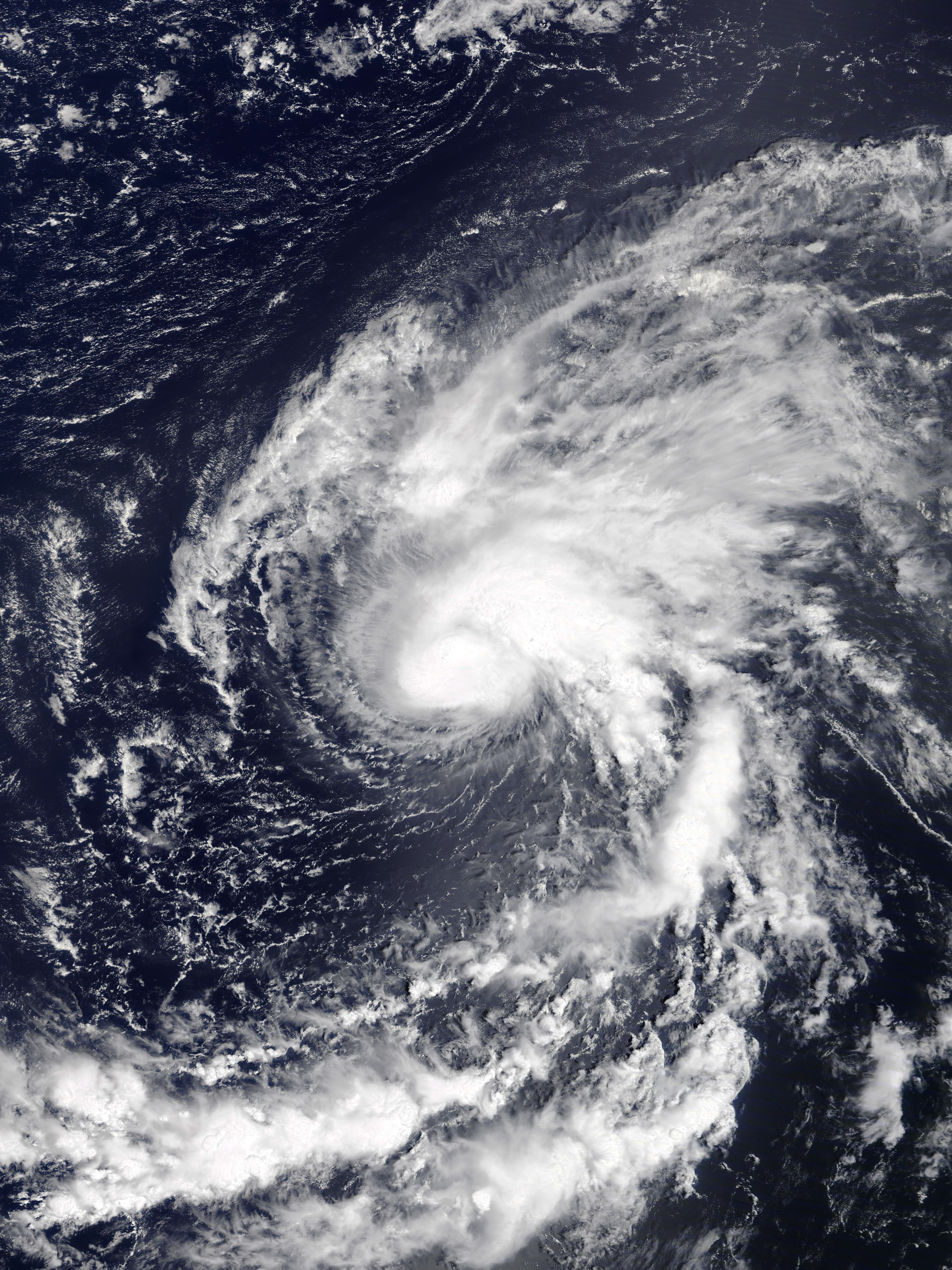
Tropical Storm Paulette on September 8

As early as 12:00 UTC on August 30, the National Hurricane Center (NHC) began to track a tropical wave located over Africa for possible development once it was to move into the Tropical Atlantic. The wave, which moved off the coast of West Africa on September 2, produced a large area of convection, or thunderstorms, over the Eastern Atlantic as it trekked westward. To the west of the disturbance was another broad area of low atmospheric pressure, which merged with the wave on September 5, producing a well-defined surface low. However, convective activity remained disorganized. Despite this, the disturbance gained sufficient organization by 00:00 UTC on September 7 to be designated a tropical depression, about 1,160 miles (1,870 km) west of the Cabo Verde Islands. Late on that morning, an Advanced Scatterometer (ASCAT) pass indicated that the depression had begun to produce winds up to gale-force, warranting its upgrade to Tropical Storm Paulette 12 hours later.

Paulette moved generally west-northwestward over the warm Atlantic waters and gradually strengthened on September 8, despite the presence of southwesterly wind shear and mid-level dry air in its vicinity. This caused most of its thunderstorms to be dislocated from the low-level circulation (LLC) on satellite images. As a high-pressure area began to develop to the north, Paulette accelerated slightly on the same day. At 15:00 UTC on September 8, Paulette reached its first peak intensity with 1-minute sustained winds of 60 mph (97 km/h) and a minimum central pressure of 996 mbars (29.41 inHg). It sustained this intensity for roughly 12 hours before an upper-level trough strengthened wind shear, with its levels reaching as high as 50 mph (80 km/h), putting a halt to Paulette's intensification. Despite these hostile conditions, weakening remained slow, and the storm's circulation became exposed on satellite images on September 9.

=== Peak intensity ===
Wind shear began to gradually decrease by September 10, which allowed Paulette to resume its slow strengthening trend. Around this time, the area of high-pressure steering Paulette had developed a weakness to the storm's northwest, allowing Paulette to begin to turn northwest in its direction and cause its forward speed to increase. As it exited its unfavorable environment the cyclone continued to intensify into September 12, nearing Category 1 hurricane strength and displaying an eye-like feature on visible satellite imagery. By late on September 12, a Hurricane Hunter reconnaissance aircraft flew into the storm and confirmed that Paulette had intensified into a hurricane at 00:00 UTC on September 13, on its approach to the island of Bermuda. The hurricane made a turn back to the west-northwest as yet another area of high-pressure built to Paulette's northeast, causing the storm to round the edge of it. Thus, Paulette began to be steered more towards Bermuda while it continued to intensify, though its strengthening was limited by occasional intrusions of dry air.

Paulette reached Category 2 strength on the Saffir–Simpson scale shortly before its large eye passed directly over, or made landfall, in Bermuda at 07:30 UTC on September 14 with estimated 1-minute sustained winds of 100 mph (160 km/h). Paulette reached its peak intensity after passing north of Bermuda with 1-minute sustained winds of 105 mph (169 km/h) and a minimum central pressure of 965 mb (28.5 inHg). Around this time, Paulette began to accelerate to the northeast within the mid-latitude flow. Paulette began extratropical transition by September 15, while its wind speeds began to diminish. By 12:00 UTC on September 16, Paulette completed its transition and became an extratropical cyclone about 350 nmi (400 mi; 650 km) southeast of Cape Race, Newfoundland over the cool waters of the Northern Atlantic, as it interacted with the baroclinic zone.

=== Extratropical phase, regeneration, and dissipation ===
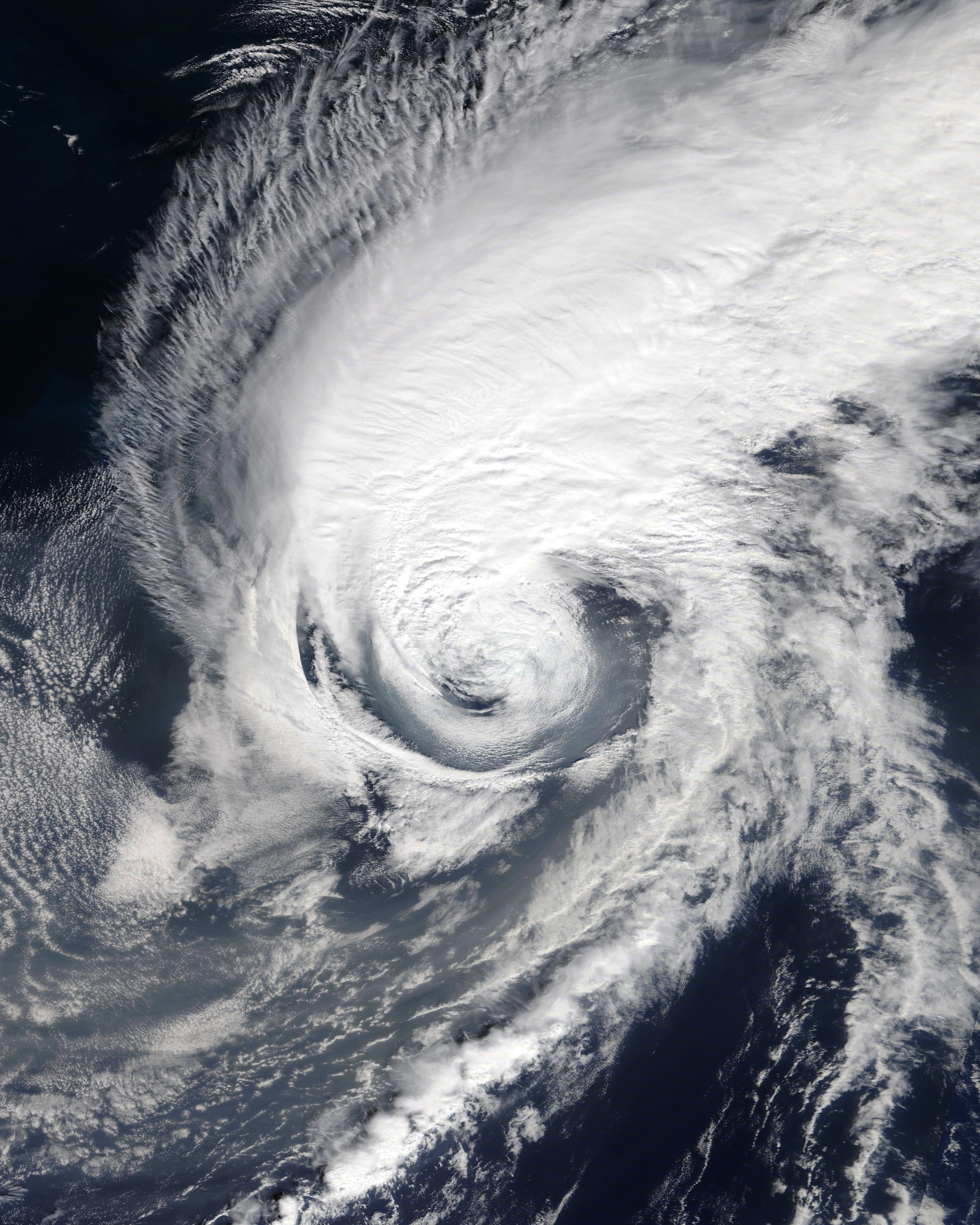
Paulette as a powerful hurricane-force extratropical cyclone on September 16

Paulette continued to produce hurricane-force winds as a powerful extratropical cyclone while it accelerated to the northeast. Waves as high as 50 ft (15 m) were produced by the cyclone close to its core, according to the Ocean Prediction Center. The intense extratropical cyclone lost its strength while it turned in a more eastward direction, before turning southeastward and eventually southward on September 18. At this time, the NHC began to monitor it for possible regeneration. The low gradually lost its frontal features as it continued moving southwards on September 19, while convection near the center became less sporadic and more organized. By 18:00 UTC on September 20, Paulette had regenerated into a fully-tropical storm about 200 nmi (230 mi; 370 km) south-southwest of the Azores in the Eastern Atlantic Ocean. More ridging occurred to the north of the newly regenerated system, causing Paulette to abruptly turn eastward. Deep convection continued to occur near the center of the storm as it drifted eastward and obtained an eye-like feature, where it reached its third and final peak intensity with winds of 60 mph (97 km/h) and a minimum central pressure of 1,002 millibars (29.6 inHg) at 06:00 UTC on September 22. However, very shortly afterward, cool sea surface temperatures and increasing wind shear took a toll on the system, therefore, its thunderstorms began to wane; soon after, Paulette became a post-tropical cyclone yet again at 12:00 UTC that day.

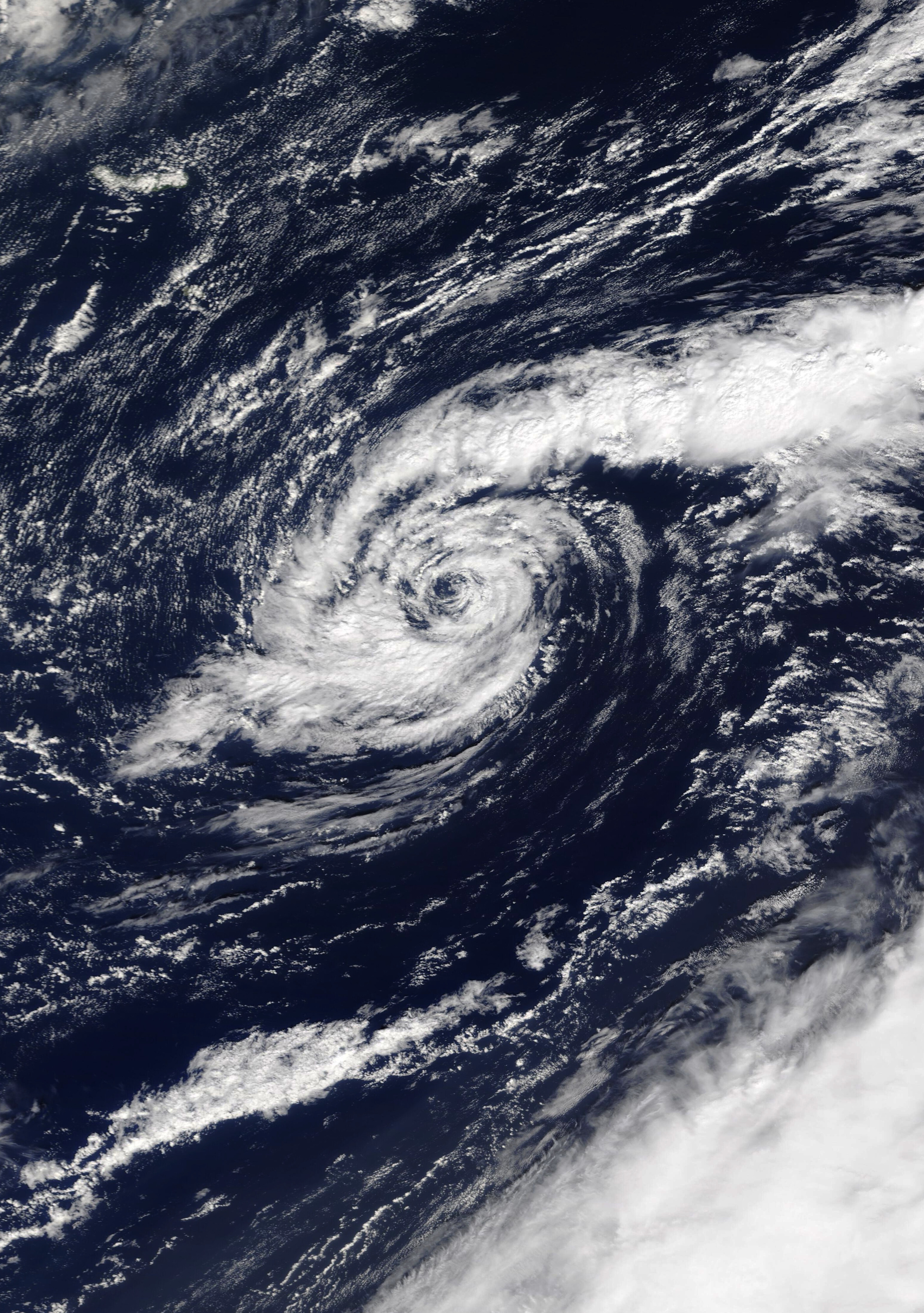
Tropical Storm Paulette on September 22

As a post-tropical cyclone, Paulette interacted with the baroclinic zone yet again which helped the low strengthen slightly on September 23. However, Paulette weakened yet again as the zone itself weakened on September 24. Paulette took a slight turn to the southwest, then the west, as high pressure began to build to the north throughout September 25–26. Dry air and cool sea surface temperatures continued to cause the remnant low's circulation to erode, before it turned to the northwest and later took a sudden bend to the northeast, circling a high-pressure system. By 18:00 UTC on September 28, Paulette had degenerated into a surface trough just southwest of the Azores.

== Preparations and impact ==
=== Bermuda ===
The approach of Paulette prompted the Bermuda Weather Service (BWS) to issue a tropical storm watch at 03:00 UTC on September 12. This was upgraded to a tropical storm warning and hurricane watch at 09:00 UTC before a hurricane warning was issued at 15:00 UTC. The island's main airport, L.F. Wade International Airport, ceased operation throughout September 13–15, while government offices and public schools were closed nationally. Multiple observing stations in Bermuda started reporting tropical storm-force wind gusts beginning at 23:00 UTC on September 13, with sustained tropical storm-force winds coming soon after. Early on September 14, a wind gust of 117 mph (188 km/h) was measured at the Marine Operations Center (MAROPS), which is elevated at 290 feet (88 m) above sea level. This came just over an hour after an island-wide power outage affected all of Bermuda, including the BWS, with only cell phone service remaining active. This led to an estimated 22,847 people losing electrical service. Despite COVID-19 concerns, 50 people decided to seek refuge in the Cedarbridge Academy building as Paulette passed over the island. The hurricane's eye was so clear during its nighttime landfall that when it passed over the island, one resident reported he could see stars and planets in the sky.

The collaboration between the BWS and U.S. National Hurricane Center (NHC) was the first in which the NHC provided detailed hourly intensity estimates and forecasts, based on radar images and other weather data provided by the BWS, prior to the radar going offline as the storm's eyewall came ashore. A storm surge of 2.38 ft (0.73 m) above normal tide was recorded by a U.S. National Ocean Service (NOS) station in Eastern Bermuda, while a maximum official rainfall total of 2.91 in (74 mm) fell at the Bermuda Weather Service office. By September 17, 250 customers still remained without power on the island. The commercial fishing industry in Bermuda came to a standstill as Hurricane Paulette, and Hurricane Teddy a week later, impacted the island back-to-back. Paulette and Teddy were also responsible for flooding and coastal erosion impacting several of Bermuda's nature reserves, such as Coopers Island Nature Reserve or Spittal Pond Nature Reserve. Several islands of Castle Harbour sustained significant erosion on cliffs, which caused some of the fortified walls to collapse, due to the heavy surf. Residents reported their homes had sustained some damage, but such infrastructural damage was rather minimal, since structures on Bermuda have been built to withstand high wind speeds and other severe weather events, which frequently occur on the island. There were no reported casualties or otherwise serious property damage in Bermuda, but many trees were uprooted and debris were lofted, blocking roads.

Following the storm, Royal Bermuda Regiment soldiers were deployed to assess damage, clear roads, and provide assistance to affected locals. Bermuda Minister of National Security Renée Ming and Bermuda Premier David Burt appraised the Bermuda Electric Light Company (BELCO) crews, who quickly restored electricity for thousands of customers, and they expressed gratefulness for the lack of damage, due to appropriate preparations for the hurricane, whom the latter described as a "remarkable achievement". Overall, damage in Bermuda was estimated at US$50 million.

=== Other regions ===
==== United States ====
In the United States, swells as high as 10 ft (3.0 m) affected the East Coast on September 15 and prompted the issuance of several high surf advisories along the coastline. Despite these warnings of high rip current risk by the National Weather Service, a 60-year-old man and his 24-year-old son decided to go swimming in Lavallette, New Jersey and were subsequently caught in a rip current generated by Paulette; the 60-year-old man died after both of them were rescued. In Folly Beach, South Carolina, a woman and two children were caught in a rip current. One of the children, a six-year-old boy, died at a hospital after being rescued, while the woman sustained minor injuries and was taken to the hospital. The eight-year-old child's condition was assessed, and doctors concluded that he did not need to be hospitalized.

==== Azores ====
After degenerating into a post-tropical cyclone for the second time, the cyclone led to the issuance of yellow alerts across the Eastern Group and the Central Group of the islands on September 26. Initially, there were also forecasts of Paulette bringing heavy rainfall to Flores and Corvo. Nonetheless, Paulette briefly caused thunderstorms on Santa Maria Island in the Azores before dissipating, prior to impacting any other portions of the country.

== See also ==
- Tropical cyclones in 2020
- Timeline of the 2020 Atlantic hurricane season
- List of Category 2 Atlantic hurricanes
- List of Bermuda hurricanes
- Hurricane Fabian (2003) – Made a direct hit on Bermuda as a Category 3 hurricane, causing heavy damage
- Hurricane Igor (2010) – A large hurricane that passed close to Bermuda as a Category 1, causing minor damage
- Hurricanes Fay and Gonzalo (2014) – Two hurricanes that made landfalls on Bermuda a week apart
- Hurricane Nicole (2016) – Made a direct hit on Bermuda as a Category 3 hurricane, bringing moderate damage
- Hurricane Teddy (2020) – Another hurricane of the same year that also impacted Bermuda
- Hurricane Ernesto (2024) – also made landfall in Bermuda
