= List of storms named Gonzalo =

The name Gonzalo has been used for three tropical cyclones in the Atlantic Ocean. The name replaced the name Gustav, which was retired after the 2008 hurricane season.

- Hurricane Gonzalo (2014), a powerful Category 4 hurricane that made landfall in Bermuda.
- Tropical Storm Gonzalo (2020), the earliest seventh named storm on record, becoming a moderate tropical storm before weakening and hitting Trinidad and Tobago as a tropical depression.
- Tropical Storm Gonzalo (2026), a disorganized and short-lived tropical storm that tracked through Cape Verde.
