= Hurricane Teddy =

Category 4 Atlantic hurricane in 2020

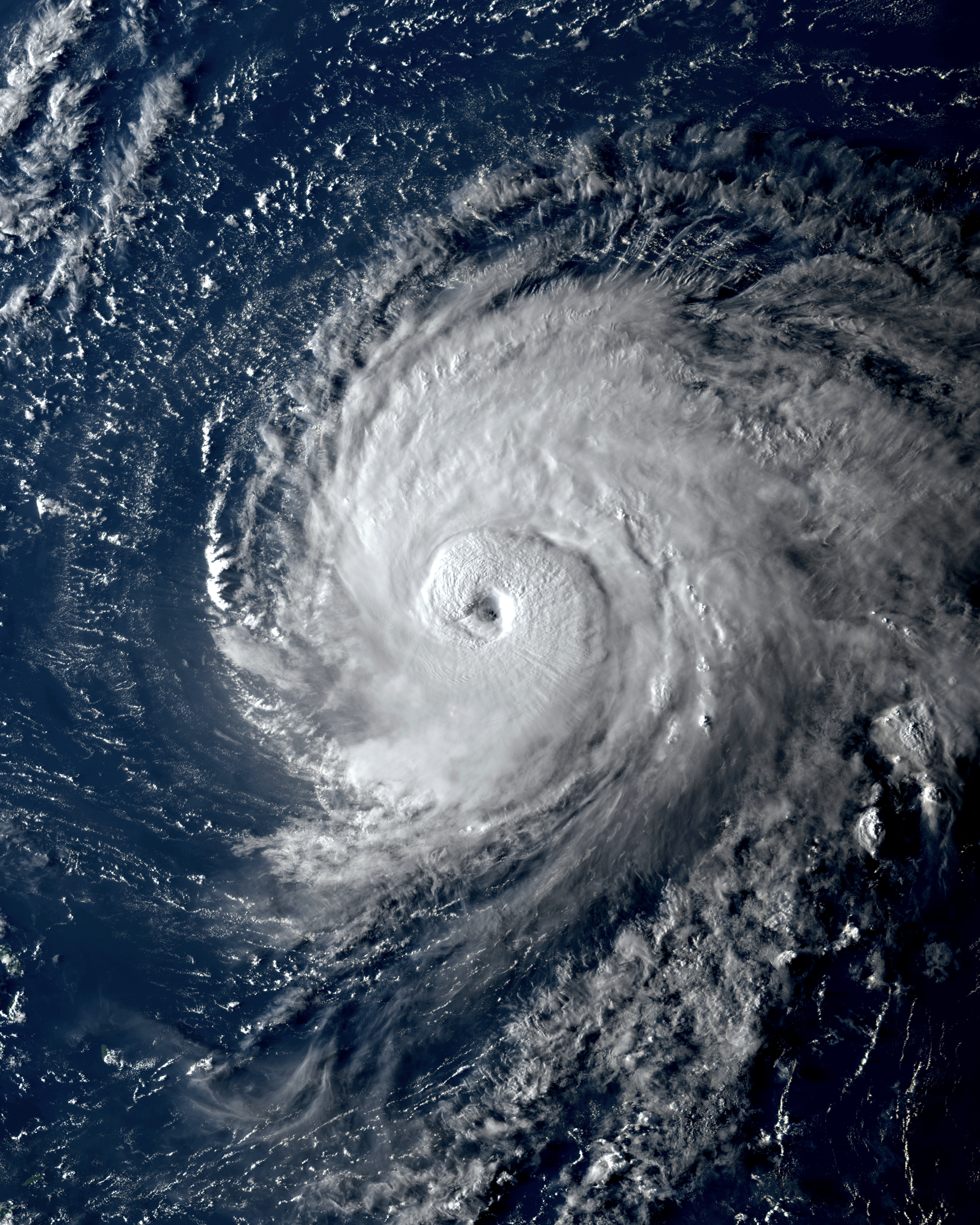
- Hurricane Teddy near peak intensity over the North Atlantic on September 17

Meteorological history
- Formed: September 12, 2020
- Extratropical: September 23, 2020
- Dissipated: September 24, 2020

Category 4 major hurricane
- 1-minute sustained (SSHWS/NWS)
- Highest winds: 140 mph (220 km/h)
- Lowest pressure: 945 mbar (hPa); 27.91 inHg

Overall effects
- Fatalities: 3 total
- Damage: >$35 million (2020 USD)
- Areas affected: Lesser Antilles, Bermuda, East Coast of the United States, Atlantic Canada, Southern Greenland
- IBTrACS
- Part of the 2020 Atlantic hurricane season

Hurricane Teddy was a large and powerful tropical cyclone that was the fifth-largest Atlantic hurricane by diameter of gale-force winds recorded. Teddy produced large swells along the coast of the Eastern United States and Atlantic Canada in September 2020. The twentieth tropical depression, nineteenth named storm, eighth hurricane, and second major hurricane of the record-breaking 2020 Atlantic hurricane season, Teddy initially formed from a tropical depression that developed from a tropical wave on September 12. Initially, the depression's large size and moderate wind shear kept it from organizing, but it eventually intensified into Tropical Storm Teddy on September 14. After steadily intensifying for about a day, the storm rapidly became a Category 2 hurricane on September 16 before westerly wind shear caused a temporary pause in the intensification trend. It then rapidly intensified again on September 17 and became a Category 4 hurricane. Internal fluctuations and eyewall replacement cycles then caused the storm to fluctuate in intensity before it weakened some as it approached Bermuda. After passing east of the island as a Category 1 hurricane on September 21, Teddy restrengthened back to Category 2 strength due to baroclinic forcing. It weakened again to Category 1 strength the next day before becoming post-tropical as it approached Atlantic Canada early on September 23. It then weakened to a gale-force low and made landfall in Nova Scotia with sustained winds of 65 mph (105 km/h). The system weakened further as it moved northward across eastern Nova Scotia and then the Gulf of St. Lawrence, before being absorbed by a larger non-tropical low early on September 24, near eastern Labrador.

Tropical storm watches and warnings were issued for both Bermuda and Atlantic Canada in preparation for Teddy. Its large size and strength caused high waves and rip currents to impact areas hundreds of miles from its path, ranging from the Lesser and Greater Antilles to the East Coast of the United States and Atlantic Canada. Two people in Puerto Rico drowned from the strong waves while another drowned in New Jersey. Total damage is estimated to be at least $35 million.

== Meteorological history ==
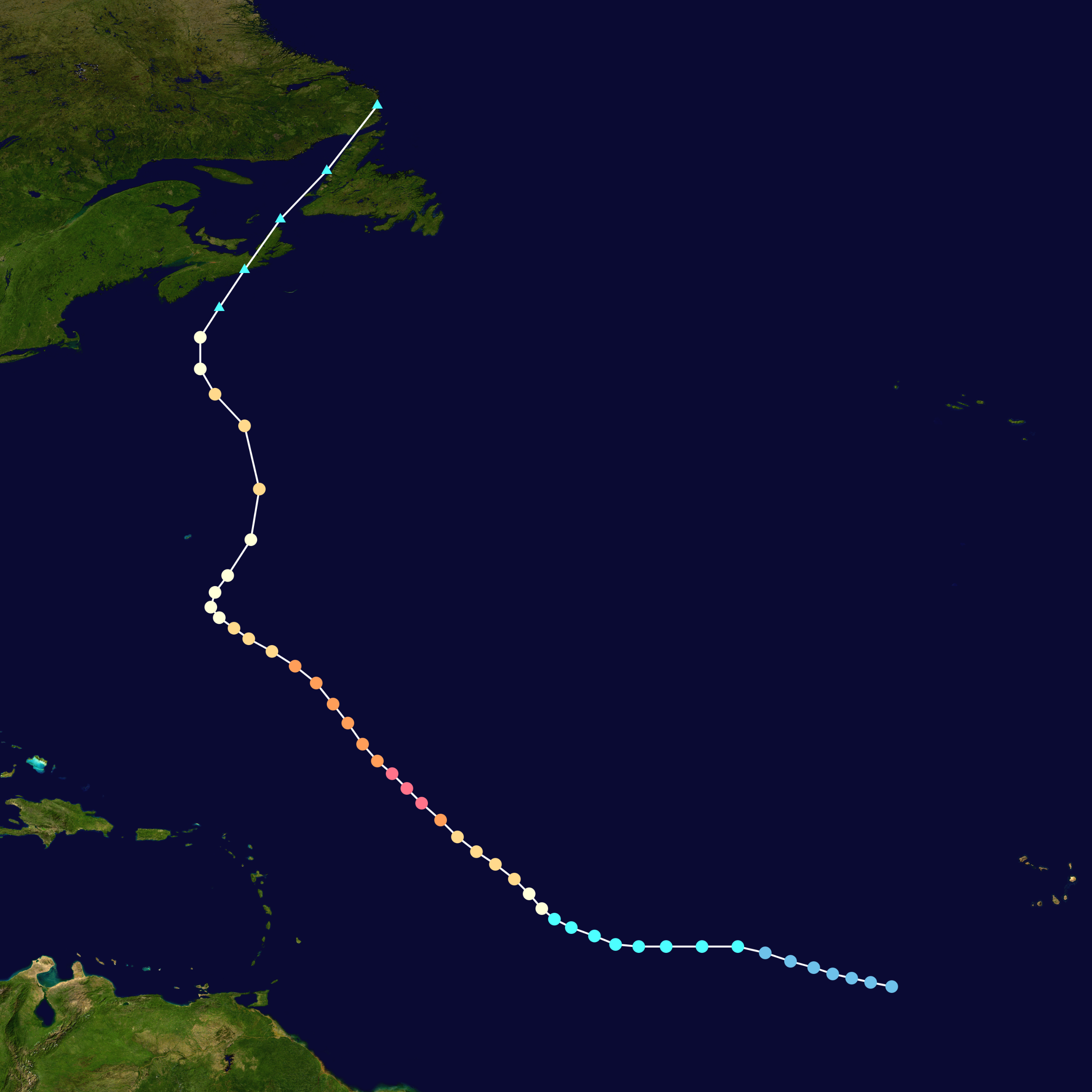
Map plotting the storm's track and intensity, according to the Saffir–Simpson scale Map key Saffir–Simpson scale Tropical depression (≤38 mph, ≤62 km/h) Tropical storm (39–73 mph, 63–118 km/h) Category 1 (74–95 mph, 119–153 km/h) Category 2 (96–110 mph, 154–177 km/h) Category 3 (111–129 mph, 178–208 km/h) Category 4 (130–156 mph, 209–251 km/h) Category 5 (≥157 mph, ≥252 km/h) Unknown Storm type Tropical cyclone Subtropical cyclone Extratropical cyclone, remnant low, tropical disturbance, or monsoon depression

The National Hurricane Center (NHC) began to monitor a tropical wave over West Africa early on September 7. The wave moved over the Atlantic Ocean on September 10, accompanied by a large area of deep convection, and began to steadily organize, forming a broad low-pressure area over the following day. Though the wave was experiencing moderate northeasterly shear, convection increased early on September 12, which led to the development of a well-defined surface center and the formation of Tropical Depression Twenty around 06:00 UTC while the system was located about 575 mi (925 km) southwest of the Cabo Verde Islands.

Initially, the depression struggled to organize, due to its large size and moderate wind shear. After the shear decreased, the depression became better organized and became Tropical Storm Teddy near 00:00 UTC on September 14. It was the earliest-forming 19th tropical or subtropical storm on record in an Atlantic hurricane season, surpassing the old mark of October 4, set by the unnamed "Azores" subtropical storm in 2005. Teddy continued to intensify as it became better organized, with an eye beginning to form late on September 15. By 00:00 UTC, September 16, Teddy strengthened to become a category 1 hurricane while located about 805 mi (1,295 km) east-northeast of Barbados. The storm continued to intensify, becoming a category 2 hurricane later that day. Some slight westerly wind shear briefly halted further intensification, but when it subsided, the storm began another period of rapid intensification early on September 17. Teddy strengthened into a major category 3 hurricane near 12:00 UTC while centered about 575 mi (925 km) east-northeast of Guadeloupe, and to category 4 strength three hours later. Late that day, Teddy reached its peak intensity with maximum sustained winds of 140 mph (225 km/h) a minimum barometric pressure of 945 mbar (27.9 inHg). On September 18, an eyewall replacement cycle caused the storm to weaken slightly to category 3; and the following day, an increase in southwesterly shear caused it to drop below major hurricane strength around 00:00 UTC on September 20. Teddy then moved over slightly cooler waters caused by upwelling from Hurricane Paulette, contributing to its weakening trend.

Largest Atlantic hurricanes By diameter of gale-force winds
| Rank | System | Season | Diameter | |
| Rank | System | Season | mi | km |
|---|---|---|---|---|
| 1 | Sandy | 2012 | 1,150 | 1,850 |
| 2 | Martin | 2022 | 1,040 | 1,670 |
| 3 | Igor | 2010 | 920 | 1,480 |
| 4 | Olga | 2001 | 865 | 1,390 |
| 5 | Teddy | 2020 | 850 | 1,370 |

Teddy passed about 230 mi (370 km) east of Bermuda on September 21 as it turned northward and north-northeastward while interacting with a negatively tilted trough. This interaction caused an increase in both the storm's maximum wind speed and size. Teddy reached a secondary peak intensity of 105 mph (169 km/h) between 06:00 UTC and 12:00 UTC on September 22. Interaction with the trough also triggered the extratropical transition process; Teddy's wind field became more asymmetric, and the associated convection become less centralized. At about 18:00 UTC that same day, the hurricane weakened to Category 1 intensity, before becoming an extratropical low at around 00:00 UTC on September 23, while located about 190 mi (310 km) south of Halifax, Nova Scotia. Just before this transition, the diameter of gale-force winds measured up to 850 mi (1,370 km) across from northeast to southwest, making Teddy the 4th largest Atlantic hurricane on record.

At 12:00 UTC on September 23, the storm made landfall near Ecum Secum, Nova Scotia, with sustained winds of 65 mph (105 km/h). The storm weakened as it moved northward across eastern Nova Scotia and then the Gulf of St. Lawrence, where it was absorbed by a larger non-tropical low early on September 24, near eastern Labrador. This low, fueled by Teddy's remnant energy, accelerated northward, before proceeding to make a counterclockwise loop over the Labrador Sea for the next couple of days, briefly strengthening back into a hurricane-force low, before weakening again. Afterward, it slowly drifted eastward, before being absorbed into another larger storm near Iceland on September 29.

== Preparations and impact ==
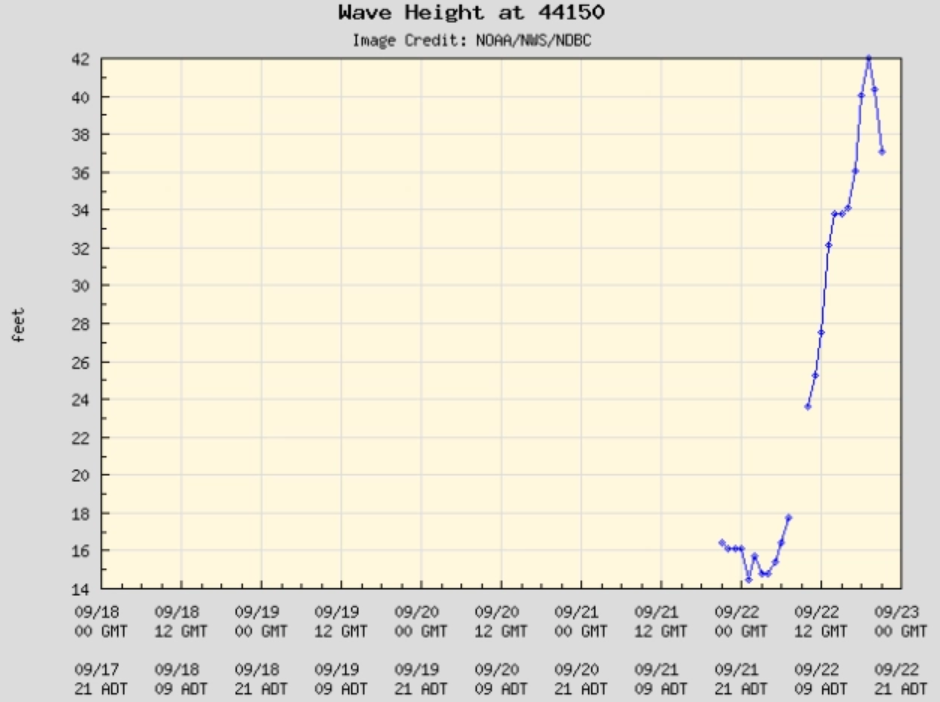
A wave height of 42 feet was recorded during Hurricane Teddy by buoy 44150 near Nova Scotia.

Large swells were generated by the storm, which affected the Lesser Antilles, the East Coast of the United States, Bermuda, and Atlantic Canada. One buoy operated by the National Oceanic and Atmospheric Administration (NOAA) in the open northern Atlantic off the coast of Nova Scotia reported a wave height of 35 feet (11 m) early on September 22. Another wave height of 40 feet (12 m) was reported later in the day by the same buoy. Waves reached 42 feet (13 m) at another buoy just north of Teddy on the afternoon of September 22, with winds gusting near 70 mph (115 km/h).

=== Bermuda ===
Tropical storm watches, which were later upgraded to warnings, were issued for Bermuda due to the impacts expected from Teddy. The Government of Bermuda shut down the island on September 21, closing all government services such as public transportation and schools. The L.F. Wade International Airport was closed during the storm, but reopened on September 22 after the storm passed. 220 homes lost power on the island, mainly in Hamilton and Pembroke parishes. Beach erosion was also reported.

=== United States ===
The National Weather Service warned of high winds and coastal flooding in eastern New England. A high wind warning was issued for Nantucket and coastal Plymouth County on September 22. In addition, a high surf advisory was issued for those areas and for Bristol County. A wind advisory was issued for other coastal communities on mainland Massachusetts. For all of Massachusetts, a Red Flag warning was issued, signaling that critical fire weather conditions were possible due dry weather and gusty winds. In North Carolina, a coastal flood warning was in effect for the Northern Outer Banks and Hatteras Island until September 21, but minor coastal flooding was forecasted by the National Weather Service until September 22. A coastal flood advisory was extended to for Pamlico, Southern Craven, Carteret and coastal Onslow counties as well as Ocracoke Island and Core Banks until the afternoon of September 22. The same advisory for Beaufort County and Tyrrell Counties expired early on September 22. A high surf advisory was issued and extended for beaches north of Cape Lookout until September 23.

On September 18, a man and a woman drowned in the waters off La Pocita Beach in Loíza, Puerto Rico due to the rip currents and churning waves that Teddy had caused in the north of the Lesser and Greater Antilles. Charleston, South Carolina, experienced high tides topping out at major flood stage for three straight days from September 19–21. This was the first time such an event had been documented for three days in a row in records dating to at least 1934. The city reported some flooding in its historical downtown district, along with some other areas near the coast. In North Carolina, coastal communities experienced beach erosion and coastal flooding. NC 12 was closed from September 20–22 due to persistent storm surge and sand being carried onto the road. In addition, more than 80 dunes were washed away at Cape Hatteras National Seashore. Rip currents along the eastern seaboard also led to a drowning near Point Pleasant Beach, New Jersey. No rain was reported in Massachusetts, however wind gusts over 30 mph (50 km/h) were reported near Cape Cod. In Maine, very large waves pounded the coast, drawing onlookers and surfers. A fence was taken out by storm surge in Scarborough. Emergency officials were on standby across southern Maine in case flooding became a hazard. In Camp Ellis, the storm threatened to erode the shoreline. Some people in the town decided to put up storm shutters during the storm in case houses were flooded.

=== Canada ===
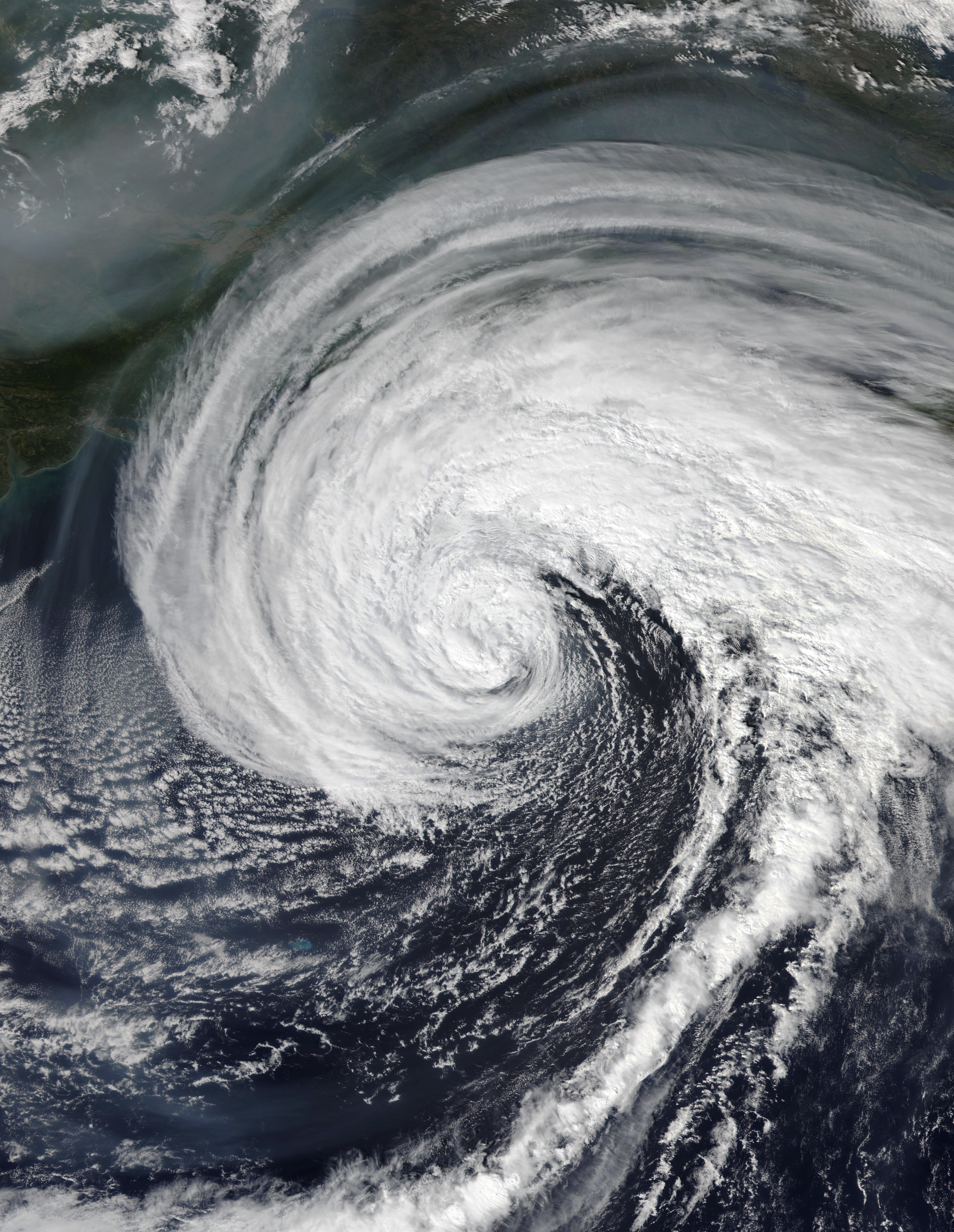
Hurricane Teddy approaching Nova Scotia shortly before becoming extratropical, on September 22

Tropical storm watches were issued as the storm approached Nova Scotia; these were later upgraded to warnings. Municipal sports fields, all-weather fields, tracks and baseball diamonds were closed on September 23 and all bookings were cancelled. School was also cancelled for many regions around the province. Halifax Transit stopped services during most of the storm, but resumed its services at 12:00 ADT (15:00 UTC) on September 23. Ferry service began immediately, while buses became fully operational an hour later. The Halifax Public Gardens reopened at the same time as Halifax Transit, but residents and tourists were asked to avoid visiting municipal parks until the storm passed due to safety concerns.

Teddy produced moderate to heavy rainfall in Nova Scotia, peaking at 131 millimetres (5.2 in) in Ingonish. In addition, a peak wind gust of 132 kilometres per hour (82 mph) was reported in Grand Étang. In Bedford, the Sackville River overtopped its banks, flooding a nearby park. Around 20,000 customers lost power across the province, but impacts in Nova Scotia were less than originally predicted. Total damage in Canada was C$20 million (US$15 million).

== See also ==
- Tropical cyclones in 2020
- List of Category 4 Atlantic hurricanes
- List of Canada hurricanes
- List of Bermuda hurricanes
- Hurricane Gert (1999) – A hurricane that took an almost identical track.
- Hurricane Juan (2003) – One of the most devastating hurricanes to affect Atlantic Canada.
- Hurricane Bill (2009) – A storm of similar strength that also affected Atlantic Canada.
- Hurricane Igor (2010) – Had a similar intensity and nearly identical track.
- Hurricane Larry (2021) – Another long-lived Cape Verde hurricane which impacted Atlantic Canada.
