= Bermuda Weather Service =

Meteorological service of Bermuda

- Established: 1995 (31 years ago)
- Types: national meteorological service
- Headquarters: L.F. Wade International Airport
- Coordinates: 32°22′03″N 64°40′38″W
- Parent organisations: Ministry of Transport and Tourism
- Affiliations: Met Office

The Bermuda Weather Service is Bermuda's national meteorological service. It provides public, marine, tropical and aviation weather forecasts as well as warnings and climatolological services. The service began operations under contract from the Department of Airport Operations, Ministry of Transport and Tourism, in 1995. Prior to that, the island's meteorological services were provided by a US Navy base on the island.
