= List of Bermuda hurricanes =

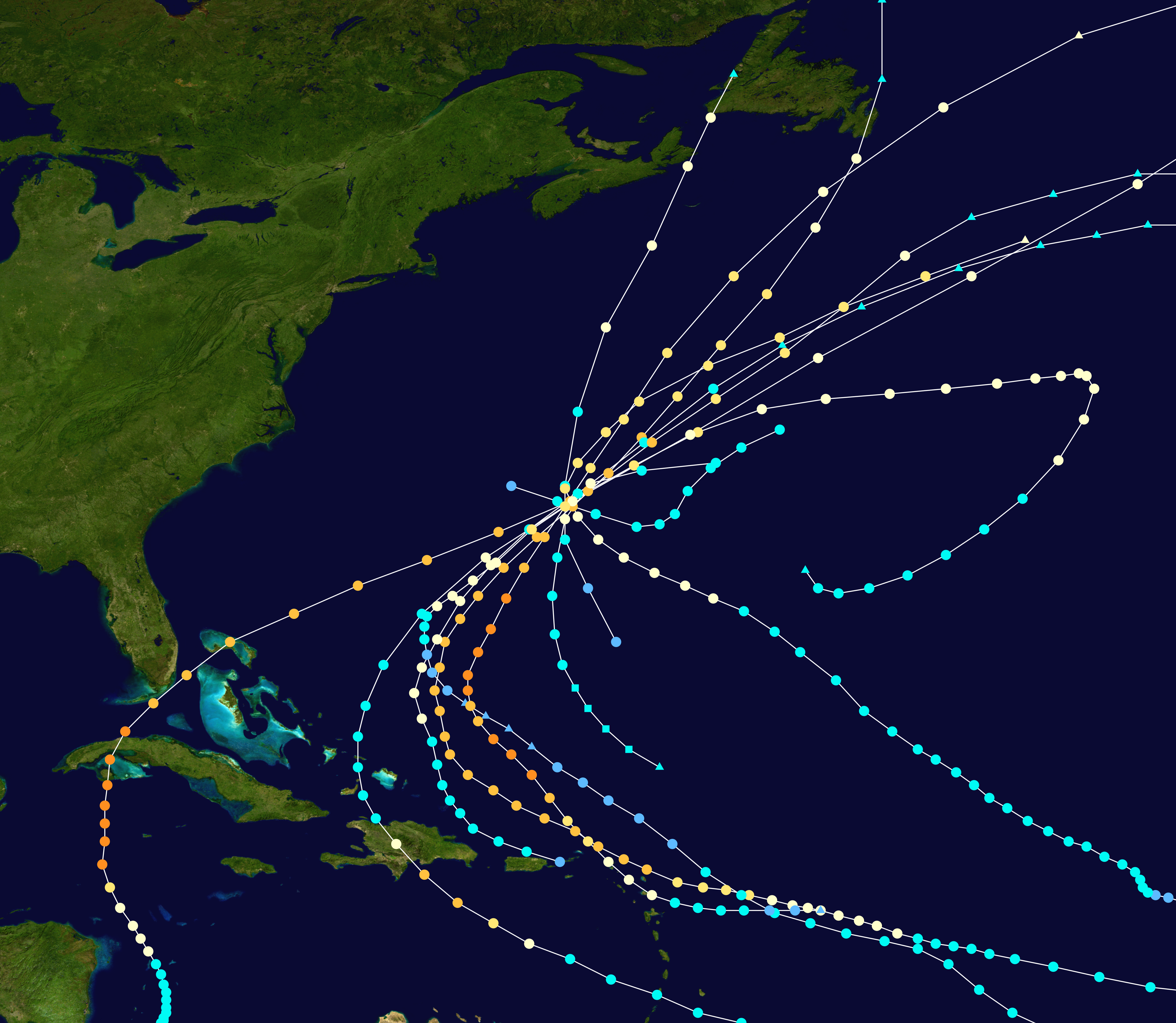
Map depicting the paths of all landfalling tropical cyclones in the territory since 1851

The British Overseas Territory of Bermuda has a long history of encounters with Atlantic tropical cyclones, many of which inflicted significant damage and influenced the territory's development. A small archipelago comprising about 138 islands and islets, Bermuda occupies 21 square miles (54 km^{2}) in the North Atlantic Ocean, roughly 650 miles (1,050 km) east of Cape Hatteras, North Carolina. The islands are situated far outside the Main Development Region for Atlantic hurricanes, but within the typical belt of recurving tropical cyclones. Most storms form in the central Atlantic or western Caribbean Sea before approaching Bermuda from the southwest; storms forming north of 28°N are unlikely to impact the territory.

According to the Bermuda Weather Service, Bermuda experiences a damaging tropical cyclone once every six to seven years, on average. Due to the small area of the island chain, landfalls and direct hits are rare. Strictly speaking, only 11 landfalls have occurred during years included in the official Atlantic hurricane database, starting in 1851. When hurricanes Fay and Gonzalo struck Bermuda just days apart in October 2014, that season became the first to produce two landfalls. Two damaging storms impacted Bermuda in September 1899, but the center of the first narrowly missed the islands. Tropical cyclones, and their antecedent or remnant weather systems, have affected the territory in all seasons, most frequently in the late summer months. A study of recorded storms from 1609 to 1996 found that direct hits from hurricanes were most common in early September and late October, with an intervening relative lull creating two distinct 'seasons'.

Hurricanes late in the year often receive baroclinic enhancement while undergoing extratropical transition. Bermuda is less likely to be impacted during years when the Caribbean, Gulf of Mexico, and southeastern United States are favored targets. Even in intense hurricanes, the islands tend to fare relatively well; ever since a cyclone in 1712 destroyed many wooden buildings, most structures have been built with stone walls and roofs, and are able to withstand severe winds. As a result, hurricane-related deaths have been uncommon since the early 18th century. Ten storms have collectively caused 129 fatalities; 110 of them, or 85%, were the result of shipwrecks along the shore in Hurricane "Ten" of 1926. Hurricane Fabian in 2003 was the only system in the weather satellite era to cause storm-related deaths.

In total, 200 storm events are listed, with widely varying degrees of damage. A hurricane in 1609 was responsible for the first permanent settlement in Bermuda: in late July, the Jamestown-bound, British ship Sea Venture nearly foundered in the storm and sought refuge on the islands, which the passengers found surprisingly hospitable. Hurricane Fabian was the most intense system to impact the territory in modern times, though officially it did not make landfall, and it was the only storm to have its name retired for effects in Bermuda. The costliest storms were Fabian and Gonzalo, which caused about $300 million and $200–400 million in damage respectively (2003 and 2014 USD). Accounting for inflation and continued development, Fabian would have likely wrought around $650 million in damage had it struck in 2014. The most recent tropical cyclone to affect the islands was Hurricane Melissa in October 2025.

== List of storms ==
=== 1543–1799 ===
- Summer 1543 – A Portuguese ship becomes separated from her fleet and grounds on a reef just offshore. Given the time of year, a tropical cyclone may be responsible for the wreck. Thirty occupants survive on Bermuda for about 60 days, during which time they construct a seaworthy craft from the recovered timbers of their ship. The date 1543 and indistinct initials are carved on a rock in the modern-day Spittal Pond Nature Reserve.
- July 24, 1609 – A hurricane sets the stage for the British colonization of Bermuda when a ship bound for Jamestown, Virginia, is caught in the storm and forced to steer aground. When a fleet of Virginia Company ships tasked with resupplying the failing Jamestown colony encounters the hurricane, the flagship, Sea Venture, becomes separated from the other vessels and begins to take on water. The increasingly waterlogged Sea Venture battles the rough seas until July 28, when, just as the crew becomes resigned to their fate, Admiral Sir George Somers spots the uninhabited rocky shores of Bermuda. To prevent the ship from sinking, Somers deliberately drives her onto the reefs about a half mile off the eastern coast. Using the ship's longboat, all 150 settlers, as well as the crew, make it safely ashore. The so-called "Isle of Devils" proves far more hospitable than initially feared, with abundant food and resources. Two new ships, the Deliverance and the Patience, are constructed, and nearly all of the Sea Venture's original occupants set sail for Jamestown. The Virginia Company administers the islands until the formation of the Somers Isles Company in 1615. The tale of the Sea Venture inspired William Shakespeare to write The Tempest, and the coat of arms of Bermuda features a prominent representation of the shipwreck.
- July (?) 1612 – A hurricane destroys a recently constructed church.
- September 1615 – A severe hurricane strikes Bermuda
- November 1619 – Two hurricanes strike Bermuda during the month, sinking at least one ship, the Warwick, uprooting large trees, ruining the entire winter corn crop, and destroying a wooden watchtower constructed seven years earlier. The rapid succession of two hurricanes leaves the colony with a severe food shortage.
- 1620 – A hurricane flattens hastily built shacks, while two fishermen are lost at sea.
- September 13, 1621 – The arrival of a supply ship into port is delayed by stormy conditions; by the time the vessel wrecks along the coast, some of her passengers have died of a rampant illness.
- August 16, 1629 – A hurricane destroys crops, several forts, a prison, and the rebuilt watchtower.
- October 20, 1639 – Two Spanish ships ground out in a hurricane; the occupants are brought ashore, and charged monthly accommodation fees until their departure the following February. The sailors claim that the Governor had prevented them from leaving the colony except by means of purchasing their own ship.
- October 16, 1664 – A British ship blows aground in the midst of a storm.
- August 24, 1669 – One ship is wrecked by a hurricane along the shore of Castle Island, with five men lost, and another capsizes roughly 20 mi (32 km) off Ireland Island.
- 1686 – Hurricane season leaves the Government House in a state of disrepair.

=== 1700–1799 ===
- September 8, 1712 – A severe hurricane buffets Bermuda for eight hours, destroying most of the churches. The storm highlights the necessity of ongoing efforts to shift from wood construction to stone.
- 1713 – By November, the effects of two hurricanes are evident, though the collective impact is less severe than that of the 1712 hurricane.
- 1715 – A disastrous hurricane destroys the rest of the wooden churches left standing after the 1712 hurricane.
- 1726 – A season of stormy weather includes two hurricane strikes in rapid succession. Private and public buildings alike are damaged by the hurricanes, and the persistent bad weather leads to a stream of stricken ships entering St. George's Harbour for repairs. Without the support of the Somers Isles Company, which was dissolved in 1684, impoverished colonists grow disillusioned; they are often unable to repair storm-related damage, the crops in 1726 are a complete loss, and the small supply of gunpowder is compromised.
- 1728 – The newly appointed Governor of Bermuda, John Pitt, arrives to find the island in distress from a recent hurricane impact. The official residence requires repair once more.
- October 18, 1780 – After emerging from the Lesser Antilles, where it establishes itself as the deadliest Atlantic hurricane on record, the Great Hurricane of 1780 devastates Bermuda, likely passing southeast of the islands. Some fifty ships are driven ashore with the storm surge, and vast swaths of trees are uprooted; the town of St. George's is left with a "completely denuded air." Many homes are demolished. Famine and a smallpox epidemic take hold in the aftermath of the hurricane.
- September 1786 – Houses are damaged and trees are uprooted by a hurricane, and the cotton crop is largely destroyed.
- October 23, 1793 – A violent hurricane passes near the islands, causing "inconceivable" damage to homes and public buildings, many of them being totally destroyed. The storm topples several thousand trees and wreaks havoc on shipping; every vessel in St. George's Harbour is blown ashore, many ships being wrecked or heavily damaged, and numerous wharves are lost. Most of the 40 or so fish ponds along the north shore of St. David's Island, with a cumulative capacity of about 5,000 fish, are destroyed.

=== 1800–1849 ===
- September 9–10, 1800 – The sloop John founders amid rough seas from a tropical storm or hurricane; her entire crew is rescued. Bermuda is subjected to a period of gales but suffers no damage.
- November 4–5, 1800 – A hurricane brings strong winds to the islands, "destroying every shrub in its direction." Damage to trees and crops is substantial, and multiple vessels are driven ashore. This hurricane prompts a change in attitude toward the need for a lighthouse in Bermuda, and the establishment of a Marine Society is sought to aid families of sailors lost along the rocky coasts.
- August 4–5, 1813 – Prior to this storm, St. George's Harbour becomes congested with numerous warships and detained merchant ships due to a war between Great Britain and the United States. Squally conditions on August 4 worsen throughout the night, and by early the following morning, winds roar at 90 mph (140 km/h), tearing roofs from homes and ships from their moorings. There are violent collisions between vessels in the crowded harbour; nearly every ship is driven ashore or wrecked. Untold quantities of cargo are lost, with little to salvage. Despite the damage, only one life is lost, aboard the ketch General Doyle. In the storm's wake, construction begins on a new breakwater.
- October 15–19, 1814 – A hurricane strikes the islands "head-on", with persistent gale-force winds. Roads are clogged with debris and some homes are flooded, though damage is generally minor.
- 1815 – A slow-moving hurricane on an unspecified date batters the islands, altering the configuration of the coastline.
- August 1818 – A hurricane unroofs the Town Hall building on Front Street in the City of Hamilton.
- September 19, 1828 – A hurricane to the northwest produces gale-force winds.
- June 6–7, 1832 – The center of a tropical cyclone passes over or very close to the islands. Two schooners in St. George's Harbour are blown aground, and several houses are partially or totally unroofed. Tree damage is extensive.
- September 11–12, 1839 – One of the worst storms in Bermuda's history strikes the islands from the south with an exceptional 11 ft (3.4 m) storm surge. Boats along the southern shore are carried ashore and deposited in fields, while various species of fish are seen hundreds of yards inland. Hurricane-force winds uproot many thousands of trees and level numerous homes; few structures escape damage. Roadways are left impassable by debris from trees, walls, and fences. Many families are left homeless, some forced to abandon their homes in the middle of the night and endure the storm in the open. Sea spray renders nearly all residential wells brackish. Despite the destruction, no lives are reported lost. The storm is typically known as Reid's Hurricane, after the newly appointed Bermuda Governor William Reid who studied and documented Atlantic hurricanes with great interest.
- October 21, 1841 – Hurricane-force winds from a nearby cyclone destroy a couple houses and damage several more, as well as destroying trees and food crops. Potato plants are left "as black and withered as if destroyed by a severe frost."
- October 8–9, 1842 – Winds increase to Force 9 as a hurricane passes to the north.
- August 18, 1843 – A distant hurricane is felt in the form of gusty winds.
- October 27, 1845 – The islands experience gale-force winds from a tropical cyclone to the east.
- September 17–18, 1846 – Squally weather and pounding surf indicate the passage of a hurricane to the south and west. Aside from damage to trees, no major destruction is reported.
- October 15, 1848 – Violent winds and tides 3 to 4 feet (0.91 to 1.22 m) from a nearby hurricane batter the islands. Many wharves are submerged or entirely washed away, while stone walls and part of a breakwater collapse from the force of the surge. Roadways and homes in Flatts Village are also flooded.

=== 1850–1899 ===
- September 6–8, 1853 – The outer fringes of a major hurricane are felt in the islands, but no damage is reported.
- September 26–27, 1853 – A tropical cyclone to the east produces gale-force winds and heavy rainfall.
- October 21, 1854 – A tropical storm passes a short distance to the southeast with Force 11 winds. "Great" property damage is reported, particularly at Spanish Point, and numerous boats are destroyed. Observers witness two possible tornadoes: one that passes over Boaz Island, scouring the ground, and another in eastern Paget Parish that topples trees and unroofs a home.
- October 23–24, 1858 – The center of a moderate hurricane passes near the islands with powerful winds and flooding tides. The storm damages many homes and churches, and uproots a large number of trees.
- October 4, 1866 – Force 11 winds are reported on the outer fringes of a distant hurricane. Buildings sustain roof and wall damage, trees are toppled, and several boats are damaged or wrecked.
- September 10, 1870 – A major hurricane to the northwest blows down a large number of banana trees.

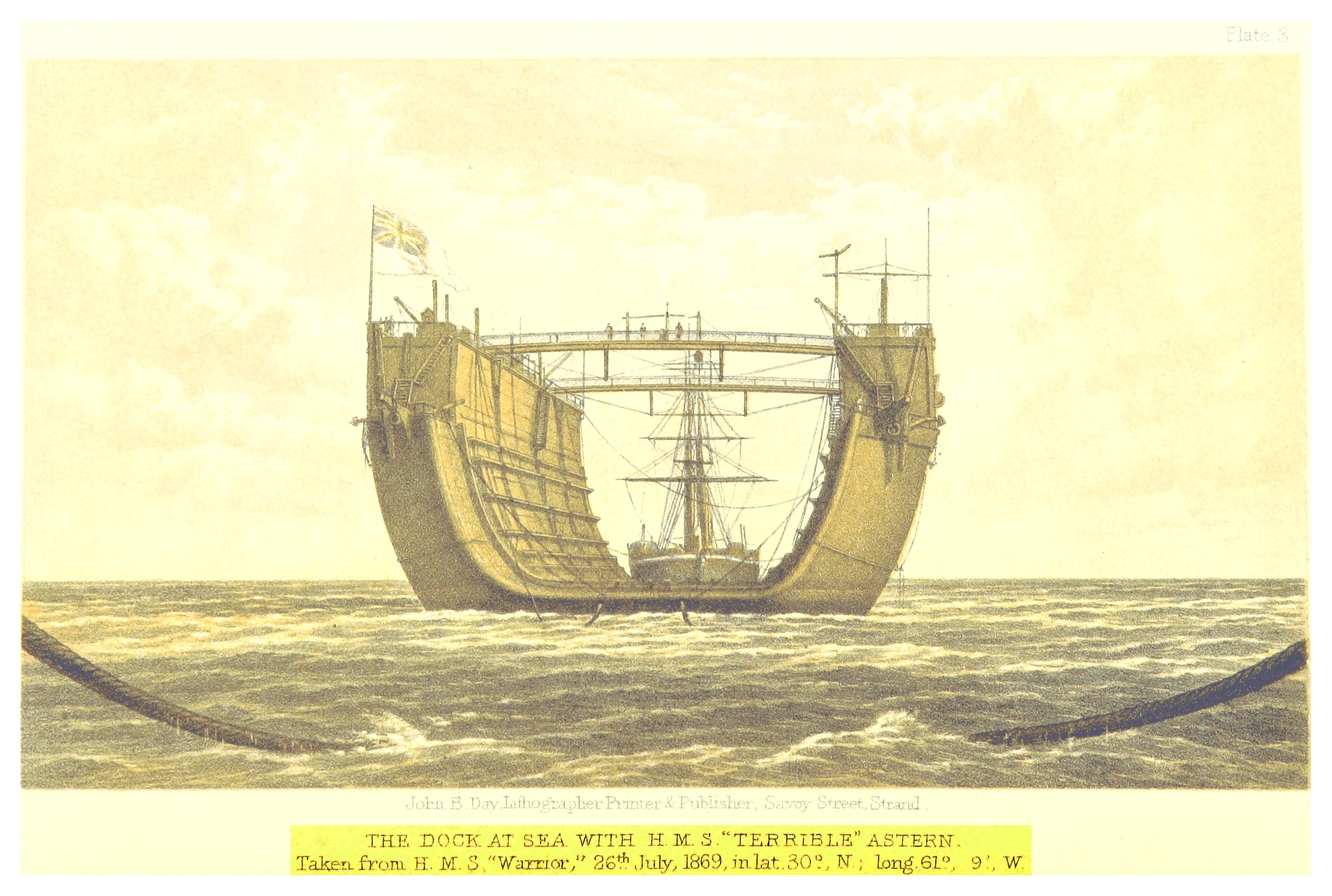
The floating dry dock Bermuda, heavily damaged in an August 1878 hurricane, is depicted being towed to Bermuda in 1869

- September 5, 1874 – A hurricane to the west generates huge swells as sea spray defoliates plants across the territory.
- October 20–23, 1876 – Gale-force winds and heavy rainfall mark the passage of a hurricane to the north.
- August 27–28, 1878 – Streets are clogged with fallen trees as a hurricane passes to the north. At the height of a storm, a floating dry dock—the largest ever built at the time—is damaged after breaking from its moorings at HM Dockyard, crushing wharves and a mooring bridge. The dock came to rest on a breakwater.
- August 29–30, 1880 – A slow-moving hurricane, locally cited as the most severe since 1839, makes its closest approach approximately 40 mi (60 km) to the northeast. Intense winds cause "vast" damage to buildings and vegetation, particularly in eastern parts of the islands. A newly built school is destroyed in Smith's Parish, and the Causeway sustains significant damage. Several ships are grounded and dozens of smaller boats wrecked. Fruit crops are a total loss.
- October 14, 1880 – Blustery squalls are reported along the fringe of a hurricane to the southeast.
- August 28, 1891 – Heavy squalls and winds to Force 6 indicate the passage of a hurricane to the east. The storm damages trees, telegraph wires, and stone walls.
- September 19–22, 1891 – A slow-moving Category 2 hurricane approaches from the east and recurves just before the islands. High winds bring down trees and utility wires, and a Spanish brig loaded with lumber wrecks along the southwestern shore.
- October 4, 1891 – A moderate hurricane to the west produces a prolonged period of strong winds and heavy rain, but no appreciable damage is reported.
- October 17–18, 1891 – A hurricane passes a short distance to the west with extremely high tides and pounding waves. The Causeway is extensively damaged.
- August 19–20, 1892 – Though winds are relatively light, a hurricane to the west causes some agricultural, structural, and maritime damage.
- October 15, 1892 – Winds just below hurricane force are recorded at the Gibbs Hill Lighthouse as a hurricane passes to the east.
- October 26, 1894 – A fast-moving hurricane to the west delivers a brief period of hurricane-force winds, toppling trees and telephone poles. The storm blows down roofing material and ruins vegetable crops.
- October 24, 1895 – Wind gusts of 120 mph (190 km/h) are reported in association with a direct hit from a moderate hurricane. Dozens of telephone poles are snapped, while "enormous" trees are uprooted. Extensive damage befalls homes, businesses, and public buildings.
- September 4, 1899 – A Category 1 hurricane passes just to the northwest, producing hurricane-force winds and significant damage.
- September 12–13, 1899 – The distinct eye of a Category 3 hurricane tracks over Bermuda with severe damage reported in many areas. As residents are preoccupied with cleanup efforts from the previous storm, the hurricane catches the islands off-guard. Houses are unroofed or completely destroyed, and large boulders along the southern shore are tossed inland. Wharves and boats are wrecked. HM Dockyard in particular takes heavy losses, amounting to "at least five figures" (GBP). St. George's Parish is cut off from the mainland after the Causeway is demolished by strong waves, at a cost of around £15,000. The hurricane also extensively damages crops and vegetation, dealing a major blow to farmers. Early estimates place total property damage at £100,000, and this storm remains the strongest on record to impact the islands until Hurricane Ten of 1926.

=== 1900s ===
- September 17, 1900 – Strong winds from a hurricane to the east cause little damage.
- September 28, 1903 – A Category 2 hurricane passing a short distance to the east causes significant damage. Winds of 74 mph (119 km/h) uproot large numbers of trees, while heavy rainfall washes out roadways. Along the coast, docks, seawalls, and boats are destroyed; hundreds of buildings throughout the islands are damaged. Two fatalities are attributed to the storm: one man drowns at Ireland Island, and another is crushed by a collapsing wall in St. George's.
- September 8–9, 1906 – A major hurricane to the northwest brushes the islands with 70 mph (110 km/h) winds, blowing down roof slates, telephone wires, and trees. One man drowns after being blown off Watford Bridge, and another fatality occurs in Hamilton Harbour as a sailboat capsizes in a severe squall. A ferry in the harbour is destroyed by fire, which briefly threatens to spread to land.
- October 13, 1909 – A dissipating tropical storm produces strong winds.

=== 1910s ===
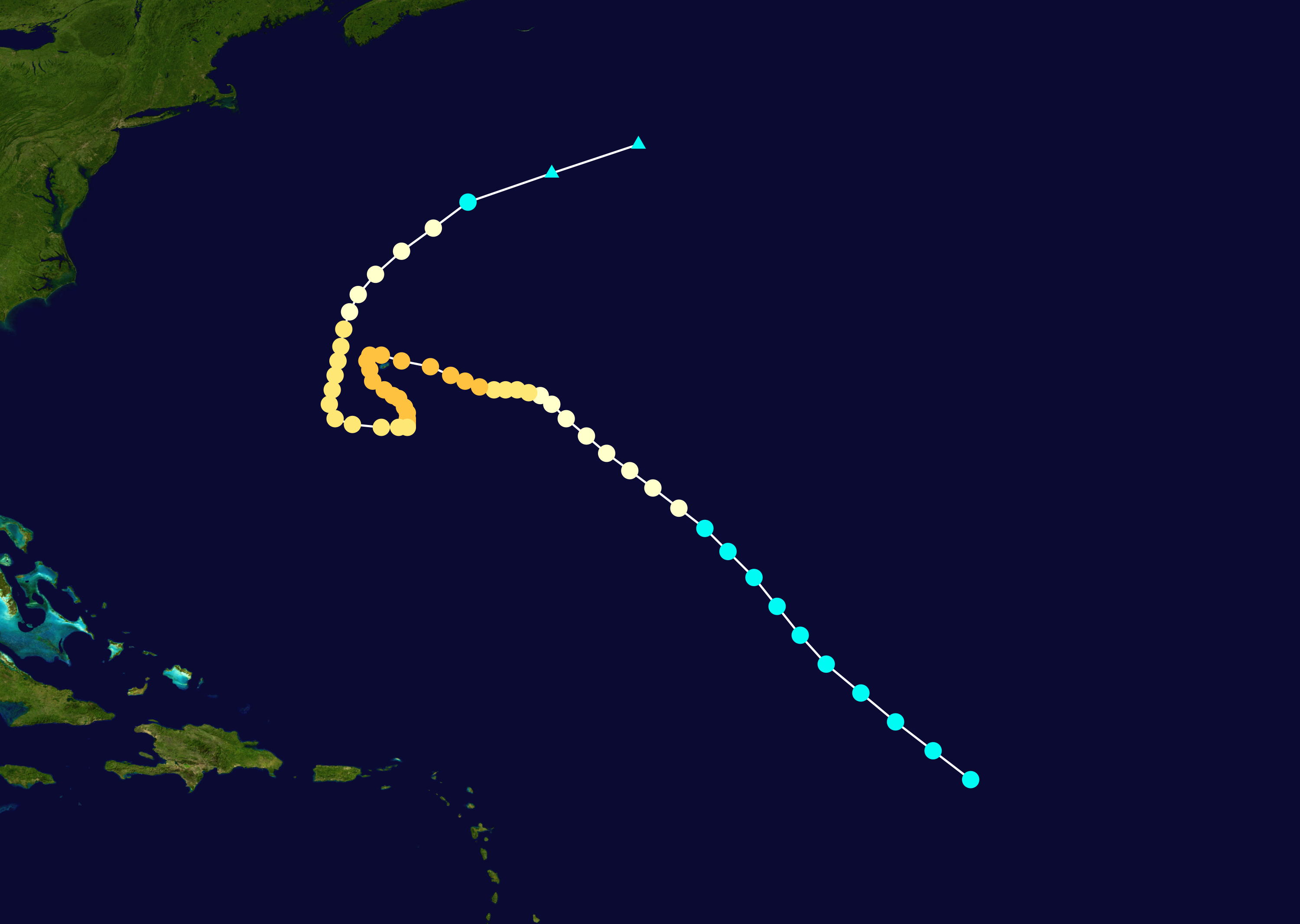
Track of the September 1915 major hurricane that buffeted Bermuda for several days

- September 25, 1910 – A moderate hurricane to the east damages buildings in St. George's, topples a few banana trees, and blows a ship aground. Heavy rains provide residents with many months of clean drinking water.
- September 17, 1911 – Boats are secured as falling atmospheric pressure signals the approach of a tropical storm. Passing to the north, the storm blows down trees and damages facilities on the grounds of a sanatorium in St. George's.
- September 3–8, 1915 – A Category 3 hurricane meanders around the islands for several days, during which time gale-force winds blow from nearly all directions. Heavy rain causes roofs to leak, and overall damage is extensive; numerous vessels are wrecked. On September 7, the 323-foot (98 m) British cargo ship Pollockshields, loaded with World War 1 supplies, hits a reef off Elbow Beach. All 37 crew members are rescued by whaleboat and brought ashore through the treacherous waves, but the captain is swept overboard and drowns. The wreck of Pollockshields remains a popular diving and snorkeling attraction to the present day.
- September 23, 1916 – A major hurricane just to the west brings winds of at least 84 mph (135 km/h). The storm, considered the most severe in many years, damages most structures, with several being nearly or completely destroyed. Exposed buildings along Front Street in Hamilton bear the brunt of the hurricane. Numerous small boats in Hamilton Harbour are wrecked.
- September 4, 1917 – Enormous waves and extremely high tides from a major hurricane to the east inundate low-lying areas, including the entirety of Market Square in St. George's; individuals at Town Hall become stranded by the rising waters. A large section of Higgs' Island is swept away.
- September 4–5, 1918 – The center of a Category 2 hurricane passes narrowly to the west, sinking or grounding boats and flooding parts of the islands. Winds of at least 60 mph (100 km/h) topple trees and shatter windows.

=== 1920s ===
- September 15, 1921 – A high-end Category 2 hurricane inflicts severe damage on trees, public utilities, and small boats while striking the island. Many buildings – including several hotels – suffer damage, mostly of a minor nature. Wind gusts as high as 120 mph (190 km/h) are recorded at Prospect Hill before the anemometer is toppled. Water wells become contaminated by the sea spray.
- September 21, 1922 – Bermuda is struck by a Category 3 hurricane and associated 8-foot (2.4 m) storm surge, resulting in the highest tide since 1899; an hour-long lull attends the passage of the eye. The hurricane submerges homes, roads, wharves, and other coastal installations, while 60 ft (18 m) waves break along the south shore. Winds reaching 120 mph (190 km/h) ravage vegetation, particularly banana trees. Heavy structural damage is also reported throughout the territory, and a number of small houses on White's Island are blown into the water. Total damage is estimated at $250,000, and one fatality occurs when a sailor falls overboard at the Dockyard.

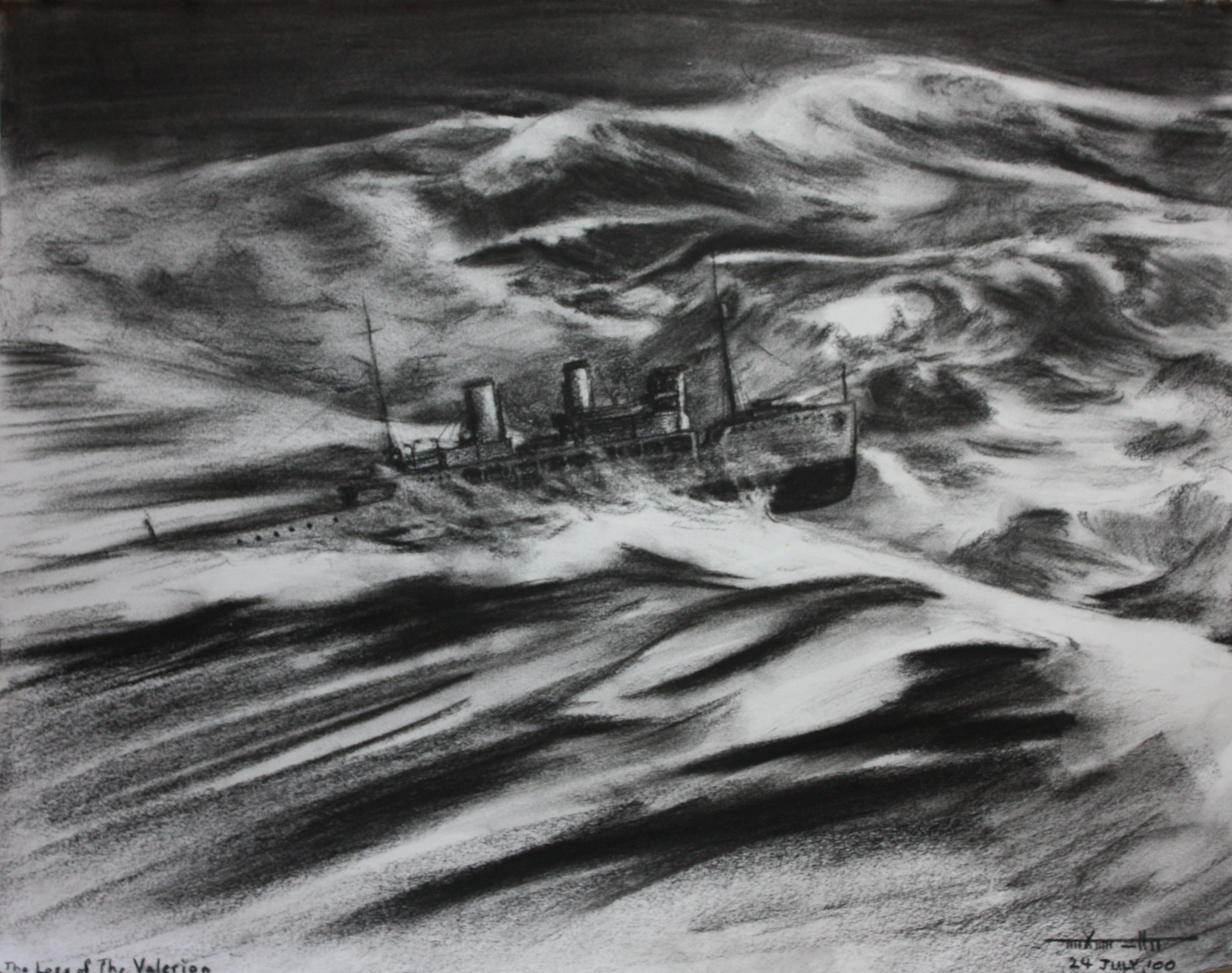
Artist's impression of the sinking of the Valerian at Bermuda in October 1926

- September 23, 1923 – A major hurricane to the northwest brings winds of 62 mph (100 km/h) with gusts to 90 mph (140 km/h). Parts of St. George's are inundated with seawater, and cottages on St. David's Island are damaged. The storm brings down trees, tree branches, and powerlines.
- August 6, 1926 – A Category 2 hurricane tracks about 80 mi (130 km) to the west, causing winds to increase to 54 mph (87 km/h). A few small boats in harbour are swamped.
- October 22, 1926 – A Category 3 hurricane makes landfall, becoming tied with Hurricane Five of 1899 for the strongest recorded storm to strike the territory. The second half of the cyclone is the more violent; sustained winds of 114 mph (183 km/h) are measured at Prospect Camp before the British Army removes the anemometer to protect it from damage. Conditions at the Royal Naval Dockyard prevent its personnel from taking its anemometer down; it measures 138 mph (222 km/h) at 13:00 UTC, before the wind destroys it. Gusts over 100 mph (200 km/h) are recorded in the City of Hamilton. Damage is widespread but not extreme; although 40% of Bermuda's houses sustain roof damage, only two are destroyed. The storm destroys banana plantations and fields of other crops. The Arabis-class warship Valerian sinks less than 5 mi (8 km) from HM Dockyard with 88 men lost and 21 survivors. Another ship, the cargo steamer SS Eastway, is lost near Bermuda along with 22 of her 35 crew members.

=== 1930s ===
- November 12, 1932 – A Category 2 hurricane passes about 80 mi (130 km) to the southeast, generating gusts to 87 mph (140 km/h).
- August 21, 1933 – As a major hurricane passes to the southwest, winds increase to 64 mph (103 km/h). The slow-moving storm delays the arrival of ships into port.
- October 6, 1933 – A hurricane passes to the northwest, delivering gale-force winds.
- August 23, 1935 – A Category 3 hurricane narrowly misses to the northwest, with relatively light winds reported.
- June 17, 1936 – The season's first tropical storm produces gusty winds while passing just to the north.
- October 16, 1939 – A Category 4 hurricane passes a short distance to the east, causing torrential rain – 7.35 in (187 mm) – and wind gusts as high as 131 mph (211 km/h). Boats, homes, and vegetation all suffer considerable damage.

=== 1940s ===
- August 26, 1942 – A Category 2 hurricane passes about 100 mi (160 km) to the east; winds reach 64 mph (103 km/h) in Bermuda.
- September 28, 1942 – A tropical storm curves around Bermuda with marginal tropical storm-force winds.
- October 3, 1942 – Winds blow around 45 mph (70 km/h) as a tropical storm passes to the east.
- August 24, 1943 – A major hurricane passes to the west, delivering a period of hurricane-force winds to Bermuda.
- September 3–4, 1943 – Winds to 45 mph (70 km/h) accompany the outer fringes of a hurricane to the east.
- October 1, 1943 – A tropical storm curves to the west, producing gusty winds.
- October 16–17, 1943 – A weakening hurricane to the west causes gale-force winds.
- July 18, 1944 – Winds around 40 mph (64 km/h) are observed as a tropical storm passes to the northwest.

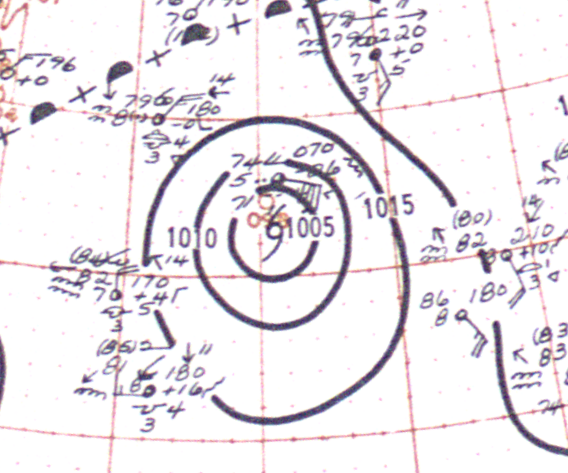
Surface weather analysis of the September 1948 hurricane on its approach to Bermuda

- October 20, 1947 – A Category 3 hurricane reaches its peak intensity about 60 mi (100 km) to the west, producing damaging winds in excess of 100 mph (160 km/h). The hurricane cuts electric and telephone services, and numerous boats are sunk, including a ferry outside Hamilton Harbour. Homes are unroofed and trees are blown down, while ten people are slightly injured. Preliminary estimates place damage at $1 million. In the aftermath of the storm, a lineman is killed after falling from a pole during service restoration efforts.
- September 13, 1948 – A Category 3 hurricane passes roughly 50 mi (80 km) to the west, battering Bermuda with 80 to 100 mph (130 to 160 km/h) winds and gusts to 135 mph (217 km/h). Roadways are clogged with various debris, and St. George's is cut off from the mainland. Meanwhile, some buildings are deroofed. Rainfall totaling nearly 5 in (130 mm) triggers street flooding.
- October 7, 1948 – The territory encounters a direct hit from a Category 2 hurricane, with gusts measured at 110 mph (180 km/h). The storm uproots thousands of trees and leaves the entire territory without power. Many buildings suffered roof or wall damage; total losses are estimated at $1 million.
- September 8, 1949 – A Category 3 hurricane passes about 60 mi (100 km) to the west, though winds in Bermuda remain below hurricane-force. A few tree limbs are broken.

=== 1950s ===
- September 8, 1950 – Winds near 50 mph (80 km/h) mark the approach of Hurricane Dog from the southwest.
- October 2, 1950 – Category 2 Hurricane George passes about 100 mi (160 km) to the south, producing tropical storm-force winds.
- September 9, 1951 – As Hurricane Easy passes to the southeast, gusty winds blow down several banana trees.
- September 27, 1952 – Hurricane Charlie passes to the northwest, resulting in a period of tropical storm-force winds.
- September 5, 1953 – Winds near 60 mph (97 km/h) accompany the outer bands of Hurricane Carol to the southwest. The squalls knock down tree limbs and powerlines and injure two motorcyclists, while two motorcyclists in Hamilton are injured after being blown off-balance.
- September 11–12, 1953 – Tropical Storm Dolly makes landfall, but the weakening storm causes little damage. Gale-force winds and moderate rainfall disrupt telephone service.
- September 17, 1953 – Category 3 Hurricane Edna passes about 50 mi (80 km) to the northwest with torrential rains and gusts to around 120 mph (190 km/h). The winds cause significant damage to homes and trees, and some freshwater flooding is reported. Edna also wreaks havoc on boats in Hamilton Harbour and disrupts water and power utilities across Bermuda. Three people sustain storm-related injuries.
- September 28, 1958 – Hurricane Ilsa to the east causes squally conditions and extensive beach erosion.

=== 1960s ===
- October 7, 1961 – Category 3 Hurricane Frances passes about 100 mi (160 km) to the northwest, with its effects limited to rough seas and light rainfall.
- October 6, 1962 – Hurricane Daisy to the west results in wind gusts to 66 mph (106 km/h) and heavy surf.
- August 9, 1963 – Category 1 Hurricane Arlene makes landfall and produces torrential rain totaling 6.05 in (154 mm). Gusts to 98 mph (158 km/h) cause extensive tree damage, enabled by a dearth of recent storms, and further foliage is killed by the sea spray. Heavy losses are reported to citrus and avocado crops. Arlene destroys homes and watercraft, and a yacht club in Devonshire Parish is "wiped out in its entirety including every boat." Property damage is estimated at $300,000.
- August 8, 1964 – Tropical Storm Brenda makes landfall, spawning a tornado that damages several airplanes. A 92 mph (148 km/h) wind gust recorded by an elevated anemometer is attributed to the tornado.

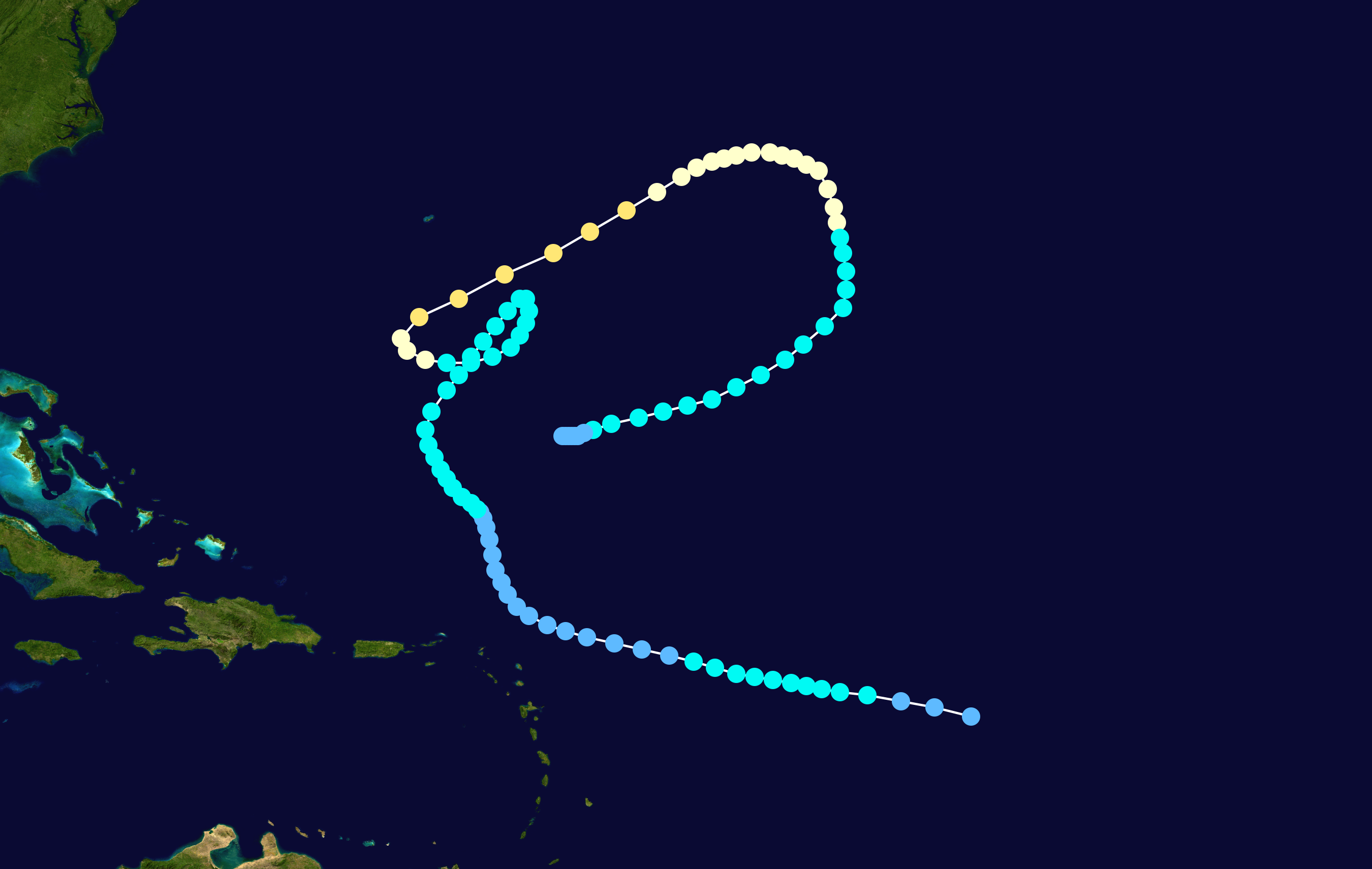
Hurricane Inga, one of the longest-lived Atlantic tropical cyclones on record, brushed the territory in October 1969

- September 12–13, 1964 – Category 2 Hurricane Ethel passes about 90 mi (140 km) to the northwest, bringing wind gusts near hurricane force and heavy rain, totaling 4.05 in (103 mm). Power and telephone services are interrupted on St. George's, and the Causeway experiences overwash.
- July 20–21, 1966 – Hurricane Celia to the west douses Bermuda with heavy but beneficial rain.
- August 31 – September 2, 1966 – The outer bands of Hurricane Faith produce heavy rainfall and gusty winds.
- October 5, 1969 – Strong winds from Hurricane Inga to the southeast cause brief power outages.

=== 1970s ===
- October 16, 1970 – An unnamed Category 1 hurricane skirts just to the west, with wind gusts as high as 100 mph (160 km/h) measured by an elevated anemometer.
- September 23, 1971 – A long-duration wind event marks the passage of Hurricane Ginger to the south. Naval Air Station Bermuda observes 17 hours of gale-force winds, peaking at 75 mph (121 km/h).
- July 4, 1973 – Category 1 Hurricane Alice produces strong wind gusts and 4.57 in (116 mm) of rain as it passes about 20 mi (32 km) to the west. Despite blowing down a few trees and powerlines, the storm proved beneficial, helping to alleviate persistent drought conditions.
- September 26–27, 1975 – Category 2 Hurricane Fay passes about 40 mi (60 km) to the northeast, generating wind gusts to 69 mph (111 km/h) and dropping 2.8 in (0.071 m) of rain.
- September 9, 1977 – Light rainfall accumulations are reported in association with Tropical Storm Clara.
- September 27, 1977 – Tropical Storm Dorothy passes about 60 mi (97 km) to the southeast, yielding 3.74 in (95 mm) of rain.
- October 14, 1977 – Tropical Storm Evelyn makes landfall, but the strongest part of the storm remains offshore; Bermuda experiences 2.6 in (66 mm) of rain and only light winds.
- September 15, 1978 – A subtropical storm, future-Tropical Storm Hope, brushes the island with light rain showers amounting to 1.07 in (27 mm).
- October 11, 1978 – The remnants of Tropical Storm Juliet combine with a non-tropical storm system to produce moderate rains.

=== 1980s ===
- September 2, 1981 – The center of Tropical Storm Emily passes near the island, producing rough seas and 4.92 in (125 mm) of rain.
- September 8, 1981 – Hurricane Floyd weakens to a tropical storm and passes just southeast, placing Bermuda on the weaker side of the cyclone. The encounter yields only brief rain showers.
- September 16, 1982 – As Category 2 Hurricane Debby passes about 80 mi (130 km) to the west, wind gusts near 70 mph (110 km/h) bring down a few trees and powerlines, but cause no major damage.
- September 30, 1984 – The center of Tropical Storm Hortense passes a few miles to the west, with no significant effects.
- July 16, 1985 – Tropical Storm Ana passes to the west, producing wind gusts to 47 mph (76 km/h) and heavy rain. Some households lose electricity for several days.
- August 12, 1985 – Tropical Storm Claudette to the north causes gusty winds and light rainfall.
- August 13, 1987 – Wind gusts to 50 mph (80 km/h) and 1.65 in (42 mm) are reported in association with Tropical Storm Arlene about 60 mph (97 km/h) to the north.
- September 25, 1987 – After a bout of unexpected and rapid intensification, fast-moving Hurricane Emily makes landfall at Category 1 intensity, battering the island with a brief burst of destructive winds. The storm's outer bands spawn "dozens" of waterspouts and tornadoes, some of which cause injuries and property damage. Sustained winds of 86 mph (138 km/h) with gusts to 116 mph (187 km/h) bring down many trees, cited as between 80% and 90% of all specimens in the territory. Boats, cars, and utilities also suffer. Of 2,500 houses impacted by the storm, about 200 receive major roof damage. All roads on the island are obstructed by toppled trees and utility poles. Losses are estimated at $35 million, and over 100 people are treated for minor storm-related injuries.
- November 24, 1988 – Bermuda experiences one-minute sustained winds of 47 mph (76 km/h) and gusts to 78 mph (126 km/h) as Tropical Storm Keith to the north becomes extratropical.
- August 6, 1989 – The eastern eyewall of Category 2 Hurricane Dean crosses the island. Winds sustained at 81 mph (130 km/h) with gusts to 113 mph (182 km/h) are reported on the western end. The storm damages at least 648 buildings, along with dozens of boats and vehicles, and sixteen people are injured to some degree. Storm-heightened tides flood coastal streets and homes, while several inches of rain are measured. A parking lot at the airport is totally washed out along with several vehicles. Naval Air Station Bermuda sustains $3.9 million in damage, contributing to a storm total of $8.9 million.
- September 7, 1989 – Large waves from the distant Hurricane Gabrielle erode beaches on the south shore.

=== 1990s ===
- July 30, 1990 – Hurricane Bertha passes to the northwest, producing wind gusts to 45 mph (70 km/h).

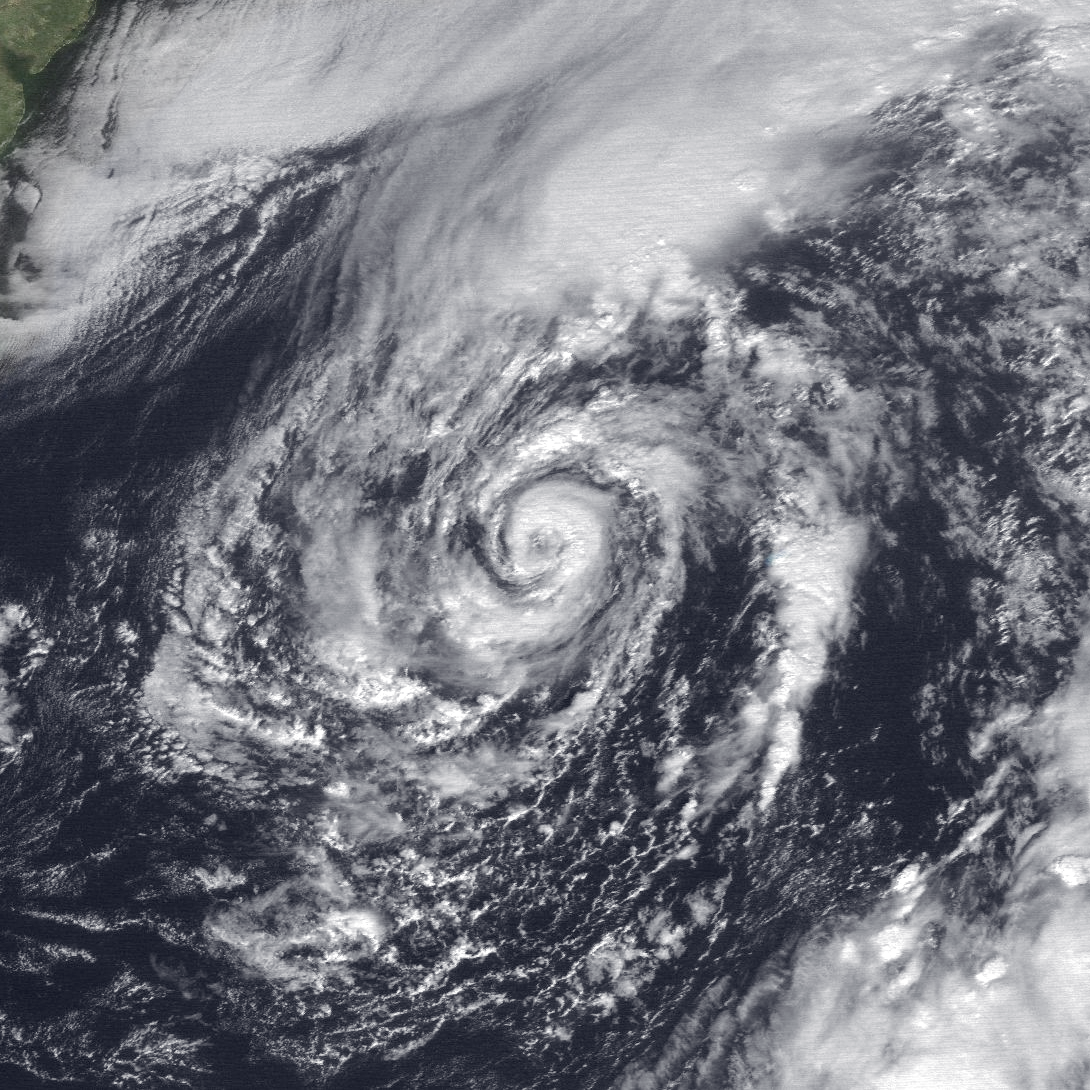
Hurricane Grace near Bermuda in October 1991

- October 11, 1990 – Hurricane Lili passes to the south, resulting in squally weather.
- October 20, 1990 – Tropical Storm Nana meanders to the south, dropping 0.33 in (8.4 mm) of rain.
- September 8, 1991 – Hurricane Claudette recurves to the east, yielding breezy rainshowers.
- October 29, 1991 – Hurricane Grace passes about 60 mi (100 km) to the south, dropping 3.21 in (82 mm) of rain and severely eroding beaches. Grace later contributes to the formation of the well-known 1991 Perfect Storm.
- August 21–22, 1994 – Hurricane Chris passes to the east, producing 2.83 in (72 mm) of rain.
- August 15, 1995 – Hurricane Felix passes about 70 miles (110 km) to the south-southwest, generating sustained winds of 63 mph (101 km/h) with gusts to 81 mph (130 km/h). The slow-moving storm cuts power to about 18,000 electric customers, delays an independence referendum, and causes $2.5 million in damage. Rough seas break boats from their moorings and destroy long swaths of the Causeway's safety walls. Two other bridges in St. George's receive damage.
- September 10, 1995 – Hurricane Luis passes to the northwest, accompanied by gusts to 56 mph (90 km/h).
- September 19, 1995 – Hurricane Marilyn passes to the west, producing tropical storm-force winds with gusts to 60 mph (97 km/h). No appreciable damage is reported.
- October 20, 1996 – Hurricane Lili passes to the southeast, buffeting the island with gusty winds.
- September 3, 1998 – Hurricane Danielle passes to the northwest, causing 39 mph (63 km/h) winds with gusts to 54 mph (87 km/h).
- September 21, 1999 – Hurricane Gert passes to the southeast, brushing the island with gusts to 74 mph (119 km/h) at the airport (slightly higher at exposed coastal locations), as well as light rainfall. Above-average tides and 25 to 30 ft (7.6 to 9.1 m) waves leave significant beach erosion and affect an estimated 1,100 buildings, while 10,000 homes lose power.

=== 2000–2005 ===
Subtropical Storm Karen near Bermuda in October 2001

- September 16, 2000 – Hurricane Florence passes about 80 mi (130 km) to the northwest, with tropical storm-force winds and light rain.
- October 15, 2000 – The precursor disturbance to Hurricane Michael drops several inches of rain.
- August 25, 2001 – The remnants of Tropical Storm Dean induce inclement weather.
- September 10, 2001 – Gusty winds from Hurricane Erin to the northeast damage trees and powerlines.
- September 17, 2001 – Hurricane Gabrielle passes to the northwest, attended by showers and thunderstorms.
- September 23, 2001 – Hurricane Humberto passes to the west, producing 43 mph (69 km/h) wind gusts and 1.69 in (43 mm) of rain.
- October 11, 2001 – Subtropical Storm Karen strengthens near Bermuda, resulting in damaging wind gusts as high as 100 mph (161 km/h); a ship at harbour reports a much higher gust, possibly the result of localised convection. The storm system destroys numerous boats and leaves some 23,000 households without power, accounting for more than two-thirds of electric customers.
- November 7, 2001 – The combination of Hurricane Michelle's extratropical remnants and a developing non-tropical low bring rainy and blustery weather.
- November 26 – December 3, 2001 – The tight pressure gradient between distant Hurricane Olga to the east and high pressure to the northwest generates a prolonged period of winds near or above gale force. As Olga moves slowly and erratically southwestward, the effects of its outer reaches include 2.2 in (56 mm) of rain on December 3 and 15 to 22 ft (4.6 to 6.7 m) swells.
- August 9, 2002 – The remnants of Tropical Storm Cristobal interact with a cold front to produce squally conditions.
- September 7–9, 2002 – Subtropical Storm Gustav develops to the southwest, delivering persistent clouds and showers.
- October 1–2, 2002 – As Tropical Storm Kyle slowly passes to the south, its outer bands drop half of Bermuda's monthly precipitation total for October.
- April 18–21, 2003 – Subtropical Storm Ana develops west of Bermuda before slowly looping around to the south as a fully tropical cyclone. The island experiences gusty winds and heavy showers.

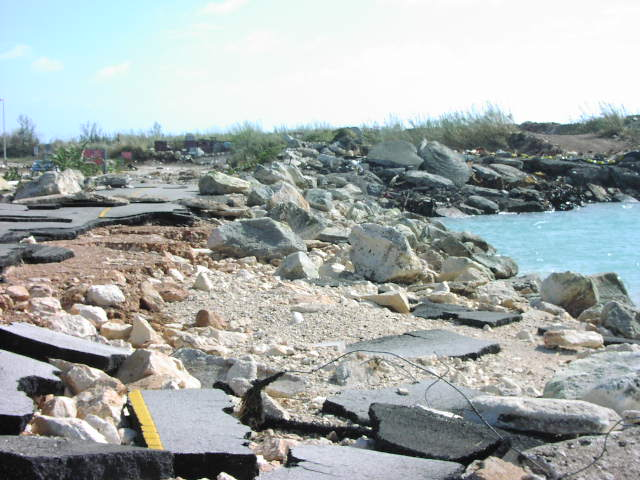
A road at Bermuda International Airport washed out by Hurricane Fabian in September 2003

- September 5, 2003 – The island enters the eastern eyewall of Category 3 Hurricane Fabian, the most destructive hurricane in the territory since 1926. Elevated stations record wind gusts in excess of 150 mph (240 km/h), while the south shore is subjected to 20 to 30 ft (6 to 9 m) waves and an estimated 10 ft (3.0 m) storm surge. Seawater inundates beachfront structures and compromises the Causeway, where four people are swept away in their vehicles. Fabian produces considerable damage to property and vegetation, unroofing some buildings in exposed locations and causing more severe failures in weaker structures. The wind damage is perhaps exacerbated by several small tornadoes reportedly embedded in the hurricane's eyewall. About 25,000 electric customers lose power, and total damage exceeds $300 million. Fabian is the only tropical cyclone in the weather satellite era to directly cause fatalities in Bermuda. In response to the hurricane's destruction, the name Fabian is retired and replaced with Fred for 2009.
- September 27, 2003 – Hurricane Juan's passage to the east is marked by gusty winds.
- October 8–10, 2004 – Subtropical Storm Nicole and its precursor disturbance overspread the island with heavy rainfall and winds up to 60 mph (97 km/h). The system causes minor power outages.
- July 26, 2005 – Tropical Storm Franklin far to the west generates wind gusts to 37 mph (60 km/h).
- August 4, 2005 – Tropical Storm Harvey passes about 30 mi (48 km) to the south, producing tropical storm-force winds and 5.02 in (128 mm) of rain. The heavy rainfall creates some short-lived street flooding.
- September 8, 2005 – Hurricane Nate passes to the south, causing rainshowers and gusts to 58 mph (93 km/h).
- October 25, 2005 – Thunderstorms and gusty winds are observed as Hurricane Wilma passes far to the northwest. The hurricane disrupts the flight path of migratory birds, resulting in an unusual increase in frigatebird sightings.

=== 2006–2010 ===
- September 11, 2006 – Category 1 Hurricane Florence passes about 60 mi (97 km) to the northwest and bears damaging winds, gusting to 90 mph (140 km/h) at the airport. The winds bring down trees and powerlines, leaving 25,000 households without power, and damage about ten buildings. A small tornado is reported in Southampton Parish within one of the hurricane's outer bands. Overall damage amounts to $200,000.
- November 2–3, 2007 – As Hurricane Noel far to the west transitions into a large extratropical cyclone, Bermuda experiences rough seas and gale-force winds.
- July 14, 2008 – Tropical Storm Bertha passes about 45 mi (72 km) to the east; tropical storm-force winds, gusting as fast as 91 mph (146 km/h) at elevated stations, damage tree limbs and powerlines. Bertha drops about 5 in (130 mm) of rain, which leads to minor street flooding.
- September 27–28, 2008 – Tropical Storm Kyle to the west intensifies into a hurricane, brushing the island with gusty winds and heavy showers.
- August 21, 2009 – Hurricane Bill passes to the west, causing squally conditions and high swells that reach 35 ft (11 m) just outside the reefs. The storm unmoors several boats, erodes beaches, and briefly cuts power to a few thousand customers.

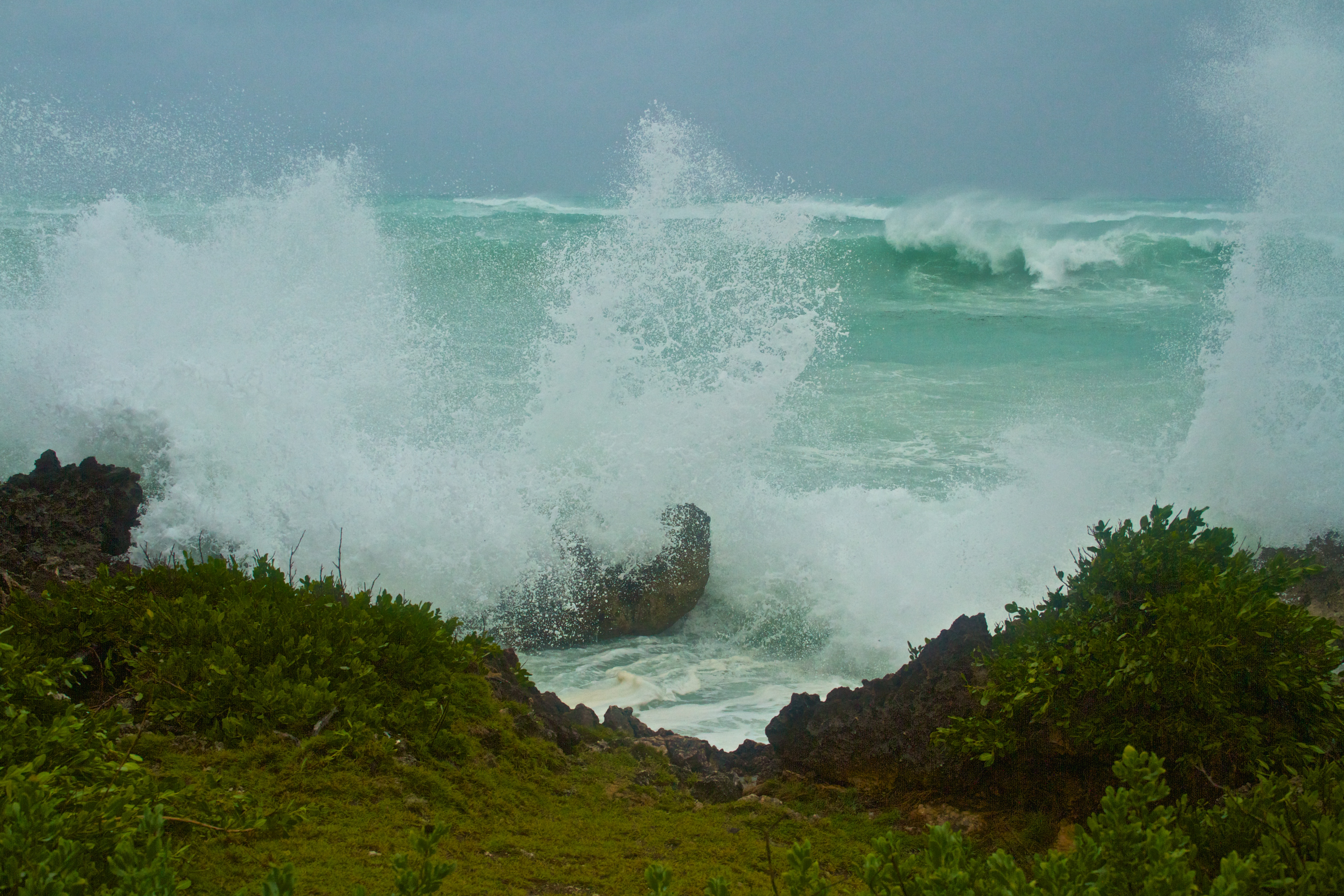
Rough seas from Hurricane Igor in September 2010

- August 7–8, 2010 – Tropical Storm Colin approaches from the south with building seas, but dissipates before reaching the island. The dissipating system produces squally conditions.
- September 4, 2010 – The island experiences inclement weather from the remnants of Tropical Storm Fiona.
- September 19–20, 2010 – As Category 1 Hurricane Igor passes about 40 mi (65 km) to the west, the airport records ten-minute sustained winds of 68 mph (109 km/h) with gusts to 93 mph (150 km/h); gusts over 115 mph (185 km/h) are measured at elevated stations. Igor also produces 3.19 in (81 mm) of rain and a minor storm surge. Igor causes less destruction than feared, leading to only minor structural damage and coastal flooding, but still cuts power to nearly 29,000 households. The storm causes an estimated $500,000 in damage.
- October 29, 2010 – Category 1 Hurricane Shary, an unusually small storm, passes 80 mi (130 km) to the southeast with no major effects.

=== 2011–2015 ===
- August 15, 2011 – Tropical Storm Gert passes about 90 mi (140 km) to the east, bringing light rain and breezy winds.
- August 28, 2011 – A weakening Tropical Storm Jose passes about 60 mi (100 km) to the west with bands of showers and strong wind gusts.
- September 15, 2011 – A brief period of squally weather, marked by wind gusts to 69 mph (111 km/h) and light rainfall accumulations, accompanies the passage of Hurricane Maria to the west.
- October 1, 2011 – Hurricane Ophelia passes to the east. High surf and some breezy showers are reported.
- November 11, 2011 – Tropical Storm Sean passes about 80 mi (130 km) to the north, producing a short period of tropical storm-force winds. The storm impairs several boats around the island.
- June 15–17, 2012 – A non-tropical low-pressure area that would later become Hurricane Chris drops moderate to heavy rainfall for several days, with a total of 2.59 in (66 mm) on June 15 breaking the daily rainfall record. Several streets in poor-drainage areas are flooded, some to a depth of 4 ft (1.2 m). On June 17, as the system continues to develop, a small but intense gale center moves over the island, marked by gusts of 64 mph (103 km/h) at the airport.
- September 8–10, 2012 – Slow-moving Tropical Storm Leslie to the east drops 5.17 in (131 mm) of rain, most of which falls on September 9, the island's wettest day in several years; only minor flooding is reported. Gusty winds cause limited power outages, chiefly from powerline contact with overhanging vegetation.
- October 16–17, 2012 – Hurricane Rafael passes to the east, delivering gusty winds and moderate rainfall. About 1,000 electric customers lose power for a short time.
- October 27–29, 2012 – Outer bands from the expansive Hurricane Sandy to the west affect Bermuda. In addition to wind gusts as high as 64 mph (103 km/h) and light rainfall, the storm's fringes produce a weak tornado in Somerset Village that does minor structural damage.
- September 10–11, 2013 – Tropical Storm Gabrielle passes about 25 mi (40 km) to the west, causing various minor damage and light power outages. A few trees and tree limbs are blown down.
- August 27–28, 2014 – Hurricane Cristobal passes far to the northwest, with its effects limited to gusty winds and heightened surf.

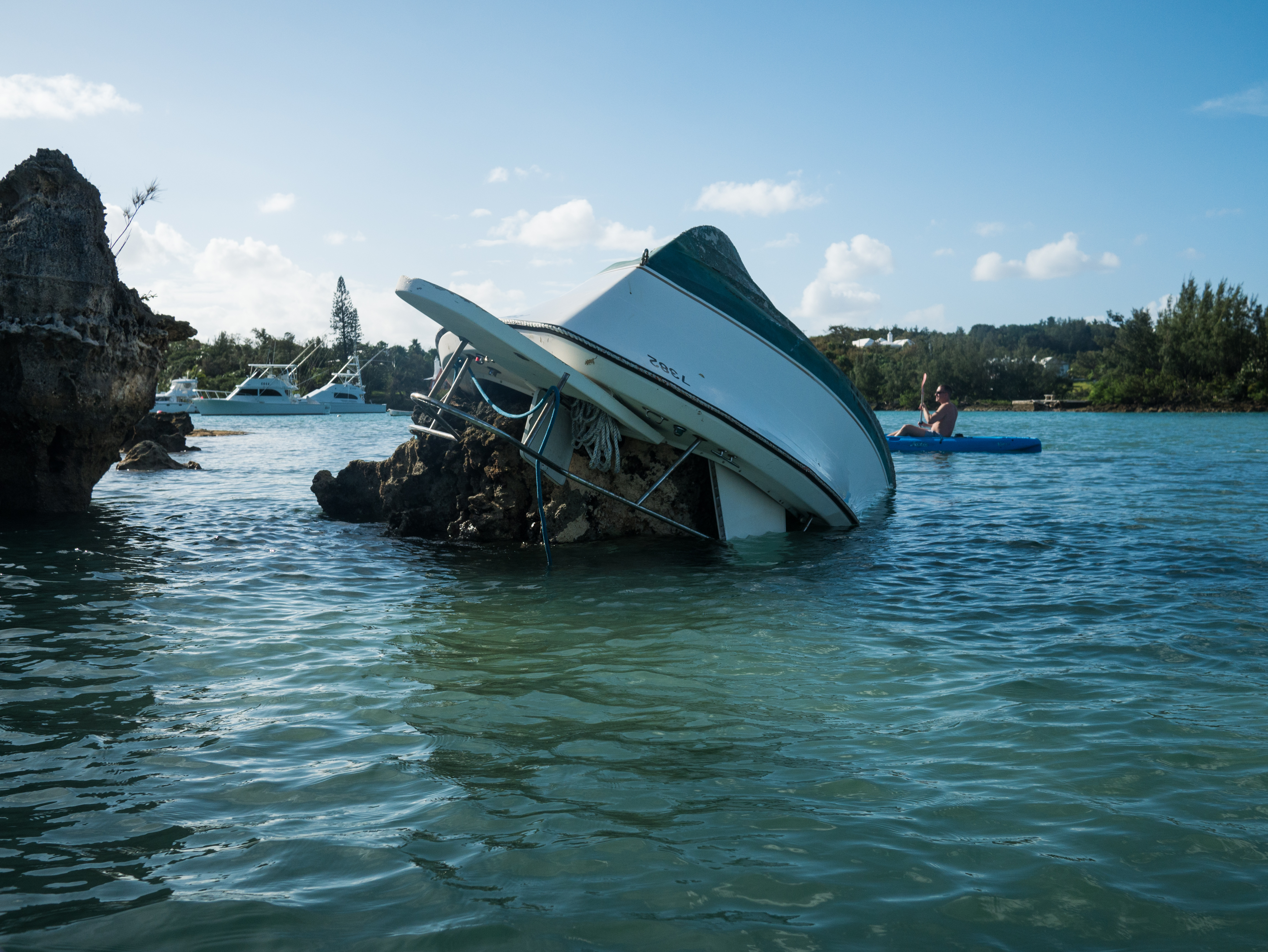
A small yacht wrecked by Hurricane Fay in October 2014

- October 12, 2014 – Category 1 Hurricane Fay makes landfall in Bermuda, causing an unexpectedly great degree of damage. Wind gusts over 100 mph (160 km/h) clog roadways with downed trees and utility poles, and leave most electric customers without power. Along the coast, Fay damages or destroys numerous boats and inundates streets. The terminal building at the airport suffers extensive flooding after the powerful winds compromise its roof and sprinkler system. Insured losses from Fay likely total "tens of millions of dollars."
- October 17–18, 2014 – While cleanup and repairs from Fay are still underway, Category 2 Hurricane Gonzalo makes landfall on the southwestern coast, severely compounding the damage. The territory experiences up to 12 hours of hurricane-force winds, peaking at 144 mph (232 km/h) at St. David's Island, Bermuda; consequently, widespread roof and structural damage is reported. At the height of the storm, about 31,000 out of 36,000 electricity customers are without power, including 1,500 residual outages from Fay. The hurricane destroys many boats and inflicts minor damage on Causeway, limiting traffic to one lane for several days. Trees and utility poles once again leave "barely a road passable" across the island, and the Bermuda Weather Service building endures wind and water damage. The most significant storm to affect Bermuda since Fabian in 2003, Gonzalo is generally less destructive, and causes no deaths or major injuries. Insured losses are estimated at between $200 and $400 million.
- October 4–5, 2015 – Category 1 Hurricane Joaquin passes about 70 mi (110 km) to the west-northwest, producing several inches of rain and strong winds, gusting as high as 115 mph (185 km/h) at exposed and elevated locations. A structure at the Bermuda Maritime Museum is partially unroofed, and about 15,000 households lose electricity, but damage is generally inconsequential.

=== 2016–2020 ===
- January 8, 2016 – The extratropical cyclone that would later become Hurricane Alex generates rough seas and 60 mph (100 km/h) wind gusts. Along with sporadic power outages, air travel and ferry services are interrupted.
- September 24, 2016 – Tropical Storm Karl passes about 50 mi (80 km) to the southeast. Heavy rainfall, totaling 4.71 in (120 mm), contributes to Bermuda's wettest September on record, while tropical storm-force winds cut power to about 800 electric customers.
- October 13, 2016 – The eye of Category 3 Hurricane Nicole passes over the islands, though the exact center remains just offshore. Gusts as high as 128 mph (205 km/h) blow down trees and power lines and cut power to nearly 90% of the territory. Dozens of boats are damaged or destroyed, and fields of crops are lost, but property damage is milder than anticipated. The hurricane drops 6.77 in (172 mm) of rain, becoming one of the wettest recorded tropical cyclones to impact Bermuda. Total damage is estimated at $15 million.
- August 3–4, 2017 – Showers and thunderstorms accompany the extratropical remnants of Tropical Storm Emily as they sweep over the islands.

Satellite loop of Hurricane Paulette making landfall in Bermuda on September 14, 2020

- September 18–19, 2017 – The outer bands of slow-moving Hurricane Jose bring gusts as high as 46 mph (74 km/h) and nearly 2.5 in (64 mm) of rain, as well as a prolonged period of large swells.
- July 9, 2018 – Moderate showers signal the arrival of atmospheric instability and moisture from Tropical Storm Chris to the southwest.
- July 13, 2018 – The extratropical remnants of Hurricane Beryl, passing between Bermuda and the United States, give rise to light rain and gusty winds. On the next day, the disturbance regenerates into a subtropical cyclone while centered 290 mi (470 km) north of the islands.
- September 18, 2019 – Bermuda enters the southern eyewall of Category 3 Hurricane Humberto, centered about 65 mi (105 km) northwest at its closest approach. Sustained winds of up to 110 mph (175 km/h) with higher gusts hit northern and western areas the hardest, damaging the roofs of as many as 600 buildings. Nearly 28,000 electric customers lose power, many roads are left impassable, and farmers report severe losses to fruit and vegetable crops. On the Bermuda Weather Service campus, a GOES-16 satellite receiving dish and weather balloon launching platform are destroyed, and weather radar service is cut near the height of the storm. Overall damage is estimated at $25 million. Humberto causes no deaths or serious injuries.
- September 24–25, 2019 – Around 1 in (25 mm) of rain falls in advance of Hurricane Jerry's dwindling remnant low, which ultimately passes directly over the islands.
- September 29 – October 1, 2019 – Clouds and light rain associated with Tropical Storm Karen linger for several days. Meanwhile, Horseshoe Bay is closed to swimmers because of dangerous swells from the distant but powerful Hurricane Lorenzo.
- July 4–5, 2020 – Moderate rainfall and some thunderstorms with tropical-storm force wind gusts occur as Tropical Depression Five (later Tropical Storm Edouard) passes 70 mi (115 km) north of the islands.
- September 14–15, 2020 – Hurricane Paulette makes landfall near Tucker's Town as a Category 2 hurricane, bringing heavy wind, rain, and storm surge. Gusts as high as 117 mph (189 km/h) produce 25,000 power outages. Paulette causes about $50 million in damage, and the ongoing COVID-19 pandemic hampers relief efforts.
- September 21, 2020 – Category 1 Hurricane Teddy causes high waves, storm surge, and significant beach erosion as it passes far offshore.

=== 2021–2025 ===
- September 9, 2021 – Gusty winds and a small storm surge attend the passage of Hurricane Larry to the east.
- October 1–2, 2021 – Hurricane Sam passes about 210 mi (340 km) to the southeast at Category 4 intensity, becoming one of the strongest tropical cyclones to approach the territory. Effects are limited to blustery winds and high seas.
- June 6, 2022 – Tropical Storm Alex, transitioning into extratropical cyclone about 105 mi (169 km) to the northwest, brushes Bermuda with rain showers and gusty winds; around 1,000 power outages are reported. One person is hospitalized with an injury sustained during storm cleanup.
- September 9, 2022 – The islands experience tropical storm-force winds and scattered power outages when Hurricane Earl passes 90 mi (140 km) to the east.
- September 23, 2022 – Hurricane Fiona, a large and powerful Category 4 system, passes 115 mi (185 km) northwest in the early morning hours. Peak wind gusts reach 93 mph (150 km/h) at L.F. Wade International Airport and 110 mph (177 km/h) at the elevated Maritime Operations Centre. Around 29,000 homes lose power as trees and power lines are blown down, but structural damage is minor. Multiple boats are grounded or sunk.
- August 31, 2023 – Hurricane Franklin passes to the west of Bermuda. Tropical storm-force winds from the system cause 300 residences to lose power.
- September 2, 2023 – Centered 40 mi (65 km) to the south at its closest approach, Post-Tropical Cyclone Idalia produced tropical storm-force winds, reaching 56 mph (91 km/h) in gusts. Some power outages are reported.
- September 14, 2023 – The outer bands of large Hurricane Lee to the west bring wind gusts reaching 83 mph (133 km/h) at the Royal Naval Dockyard. The storm disrupts public transport services and cuts power to 11,300 customers.
- October 6, 2023 – Tropical Storm Philippe brings rain and wind to Bermuda, causing minor damage.
- October 26, 2023 – Hurricane Tammy passes to the east of Bermuda, bringing wind gusts of 40 mph (65 km/h) to the island.
- August 17, 2024 – Hurricane Ernesto made landfall on the western side of Bermuda with sustained winds of 85 mph (136 km/h), and causing significant storm surge.
- August 22, 2025 – Large Hurricane Erin passes to the west of Bermuda, bringing tropical storm-force winds caused hundreds of people to lose power.
- September 30, 2025 – The outer rain bands of Hurricane Humberto bring squally weather to Bermuda.
- October 1-2, 2025 – The northern eye wall of Hurricane Imelda strikes Bermuda, as a Category 1 hurricane with sustained winds of 90 mph (150 km/h). Recorded sustained winds reach 78 mph (125 km/h), and wind gusts of 99 mph (159 km/h) are measured at the National Museum of Bermuda. Rainfall on the island totals around 1.33 inches (34 mm). 17,700 BELCO customers lose power on the island.
- October 31, 2025 – Hurricane Melissa passes near Bermuda, bringing wind gusts of up to 98 mph (158 km/h) and causing around 19,000 power outages.

== Monthly statistics ==
Number of recorded storms affecting Bermuda
Month	Number of storms
January	1
February	0
March	0
April	1
May	0
June	4
July	13
August	30
September	82
October	56
November	9
December	0
Unspecified	7

== Landfalls ==
Recorded tropical cyclone landfalls in Bermuda
Name	Date	Year	SSHWS Category	Sustained winds
Unnamed	October 14	1814	Unknown	Unknown
Unnamed	June 6	1832	Unknown	Unknown
Reid's Hurricane	September 11	1839	Unknown	Unknown
"Five"	September 13	1899	Category 3 hurricane	120 mph (195 km/h)
"Two"	September 21	1922	Category 3 hurricane	115 mph (185 km/h)
"Ten"	October 22	1926	Category 3 hurricane	120 mph (195 km/h)
Dolly	September 12	1953	Tropical Storm	65 mph (105 km/h)
Arlene	August 9	1963	Category 2 hurricane	110 mph (175 km/h)
Brenda	August 8	1964	Tropical Storm	50 mph (80 km/h)
Evelyn	October 14	1977	Tropical Storm	40 mph (65 km/h)
Emily	September 25	1987	Category 1 hurricane	85 mph (135 km/h)
Fay	October 12	2014	Category 1 hurricane	80 mph (130 km/h)
Gonzalo	October 18	2014	Category 2 hurricane	110 mph (175 km/h)
Paulette	September 14	2020	Category 2 hurricane	100 mph (160 km/h)
Ernesto	August 17	2024	Category 1 hurricane	85 mph (135 km/h)

== Deadly storms ==
Hurricanes causing known deaths in Bermuda
Name	Year	Deaths	Notes
"Ten"	1926	110	All deaths from shipwrecks
Unnamed	1669	5	All deaths from a shipwreck
Fabian	2003	4	
Unnamed	1620	2	
"Six"	1903	2	
"Four"	1906	2	
Unnamed	1813	1	
"Three"	1915	1	
"Two"	1922	1	
"Ten"	1947	1	Indirect fatality

== See also ==
- Atlantic hurricane season
- List of Atlantic hurricanes
