= Tropical Storm Keith (1988) =

Atlantic tropical cyclone

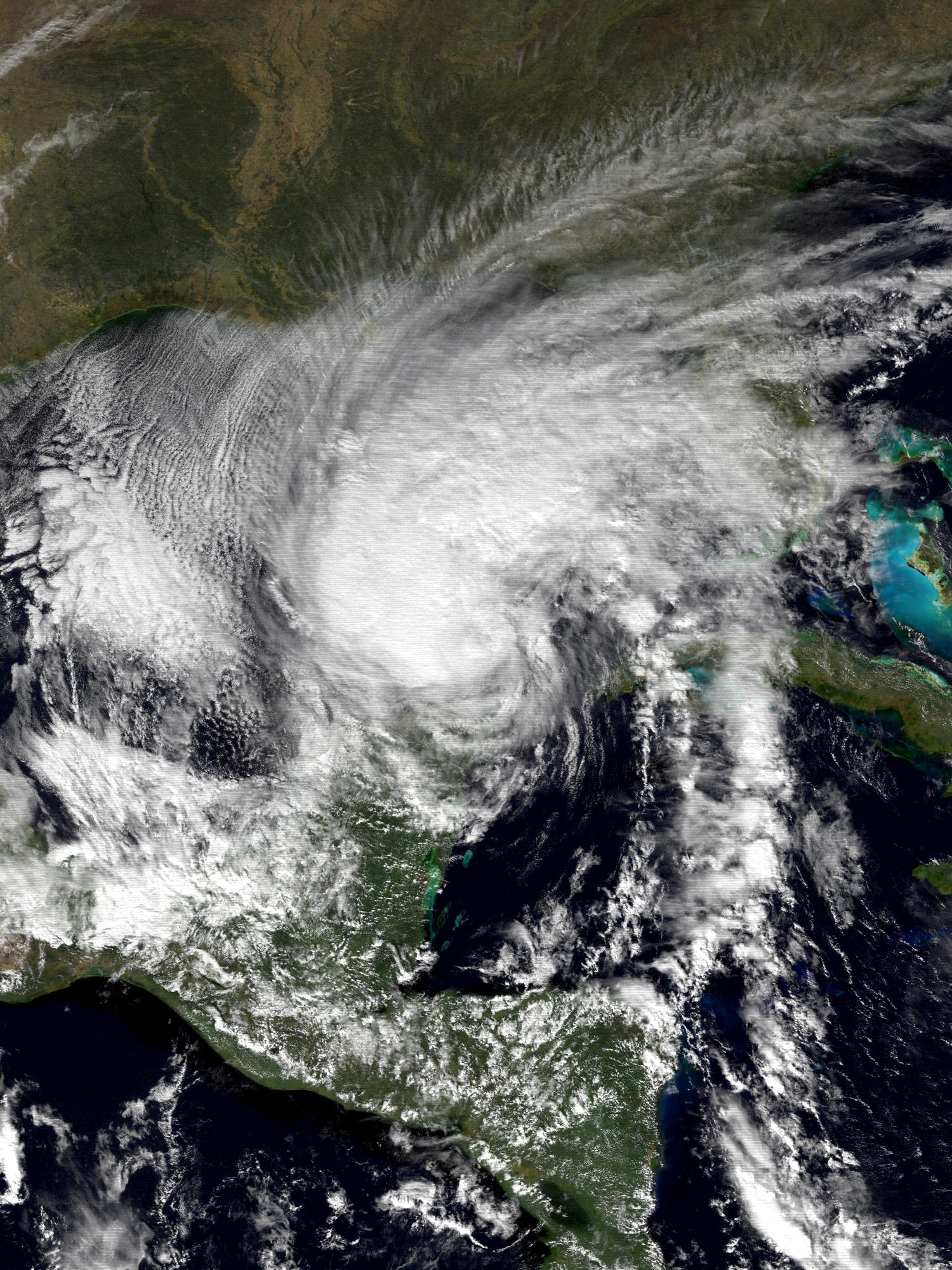
- Tropical Storm Keith at peak intensity in the Gulf Of Mexico on November 21

Meteorological history
- Formed: November 17, 1988
- Extratropical: November 24, 1988
- Dissipated: November 26, 1988

Tropical storm
- 1-minute sustained (SSHWS/NWS)
- Highest winds: 70 mph (110 km/h)
- Lowest pressure: 985 mbar (hPa); 29.09 inHg

Overall effects
- Fatalities: None reported
- Damage: $7.3 million (1988 USD)
- Areas affected: Honduras, Belize, Yucatán Peninsula, Jamaica, Cuba, Florida, coastal areas of Southeast United States, Bermuda
- IBTrACS
- Part of the 1988 Atlantic hurricane season

Tropical Storm Keith struck the Continental United States later in the calendar year than any tropical cyclone since the 1925 Atlantic hurricane season. The nineteenth tropical depression and eleventh named storm of the 1988 Atlantic hurricane season, Keith developed out of a tropical wave in the Caribbean Sea on November 17. It tracked northwestward, and under generally favorable conditions, Keith reached a peak intensity of 70 mph (110 km/h) shortly before striking the northeastern tip of the Yucatán Peninsula. It turned northeastward in the Gulf of Mexico, and made landfall near Sarasota, Florida, on November 23. Keith accelerated its forward motion under the influence of a cold front, and became extratropical near Bermuda on November 24. The extratropical remnant persisted for two more days.

Early in its duration, Keith produced moderate to heavy rainfall in Honduras, Jamaica, and Cuba. Minimal damage was reported in Mexico, which was still recovering from the effects of Hurricane Gilbert two months prior. Keith, the last of four named tropical cyclones to hit the United States during the season, produced moderate rainfall, rough storm surge, and gusty winds across central Florida. Overall damage was fairly minor but widespread, totaling $7.3 million (1988 USD; $19.9 million 2026 USD). Near the coast of Florida, damage occurred mainly from storm surge and beach erosion. Further inland there were floods, downed trees and power lines. No fatalities were reported.

== Meteorological history ==
Map plotting the storm's track and intensity, according to the Saffir–Simpson scale Map key Saffir–Simpson scale Tropical depression (≤38 mph, ≤62 km/h) Tropical storm (39–73 mph, 63–118 km/h) Category 1 (74–95 mph, 119–153 km/h) Category 2 (96–110 mph, 154–177 km/h) Category 3 (111–129 mph, 178–208 km/h) Category 4 (130–156 mph, 209–251 km/h) Category 5 (≥157 mph, ≥252 km/h) Unknown Storm type Tropical cyclone Subtropical cyclone Extratropical cyclone, remnant low, tropical disturbance, or monsoon depression

A tropical wave moved off the coast of Africa on November 5. It tracked steadily west across the tropical Atlantic Ocean. Its forward motion slowed after it passed the Lesser Antilles on November 12. A large well-defined anticyclone persisted across much of the Caribbean Sea, providing a favorable environment for the system. A low-level circulation gradually became evident on satellite imagery within the disturbance. Based on ship observations, the National Hurricane Center estimated that the system organized into a tropical depression on November 17, about 280 miles (450 km) south of the western tip of Haiti.

Initially, the depression was disorganized as it continued west; on November 18 the center became exposed from the area of deep convection. However, the upper-level environment gradually became more favorable for further development, and deep convection, or thunderstorm activity, developed closer to the center. An eastward-moving upper-level trough in the Gulf of Mexico turned the depression northwest. The next day, the depression intensified into a tropical storm while a short distance north of Honduras, receiving the name Keith. It quickly intensified, and on November 21 the storm reached its peak strength of 985 mbar (29.1 inHg) with winds of 70 mph (110 km/h). The trough, which turned Keith northwestward, rapidly accelerated northeastward; as a result, the storm moved slowly northwest until making landfall on the northeast tip of the Yucatán Peninsula at 0800 UTC on November 21, at an intensity slightly below hurricane status.

After briefly moving over land, Keith turned north under the influence of a trailing frontal trough. The storm became disorganized while recurving northeast because of increased vertical wind shear and the presence of cool dry air from its north. On November 23, Keith made landfall near Sarasota, Florida, with winds of 65 mph (105 km/h), while most of its convection was well to the north of the center. Its landfall was the second latest on record for the Continental United States, only behind a hurricane in the 1925 season. The storm quickly weakened as it crossed Florida, and within hours the winds dropped to 40 mph (64 km/h). Reaching the Atlantic Ocean eight hours after moving ashore, Keith began to gradually re-intensify, and under the influence of a very large upper-level low pressure area over Newfoundland, the storm accelerated northeast. On November 24, the storm again reached its peak intensity of 70 mph (110 km/h), shortly before becoming an extratropical cyclone near Bermuda. Keith restrengthened and deepened into a powerful extratropical cyclone, attaining hurricane-force winds and a minimum pressure of 945 millibars (27.9 inHg). The extratropical storm turned westward and was last observed on November 26 northeast of Newfoundland.

== Preparations ==
Tropical Storm Keith near landfall in Florida

On November 20, shortly before the tropical depression intensified into a tropical storm, the government of Honduras issued a tropical storm warning for the Swan Islands, along with a tropical storm watch for the northwestern Honduran coastline. The advisories were discontinued within 10 hours of Keith's passage through the region. The government of Belize briefly declared a tropical storm watch for the whole coastline of the country, but when it became clear that Keith posed little threat, the watch was canceled. About 16 hours before the storm made landfall on the Yucatán Peninsula, the government of Mexico issued a tropical storm watch for much of the coastline of Quintana Roo. Six hours later, a tropical storm warning replaced the watch, and it was extended west to Progreso, Yucatán; a hurricane watch was also posted. Cuban officials issued a bulletin on the night of November 20, advising that tropical storm conditions would spread over the west part of Cuba. A subsequent bulletin indicated the possibility for hurricane conditions, but as the storm continued further to the northwest, the threat diminished.

Two days before the storm struck Florida, emergency management workers began working to prepare for its onslaught. The next day, the water levels in five lakes in Hillsborough County were decreased as a precaution. Residents prepared sandbags to prevent flooding along coastal areas, while boat owners worked to secure their boats. Some tourists near the southwest Florida coast left for areas further inland, though many stayed despite the storm. Red Cross officials opened six emergency shelters. Additionally, police departments in Clearwater, Indian Shores, and Largo expanded their workforce to handle storm-related problems. The storm resulted in the closure of some private schools as well as the Hillsborough Community College. About 21 hours before Keith made its final landfall, the National Hurricane Center issued a tropical storm warning along the Florida west coast from Cape Sable to Cedar Key. The next day, a tropical storm warning was posted from Jupiter, Florida, north to Savannah, Georgia. A tropical storm warning was briefly issued for Bermuda, as well.

== Impact ==
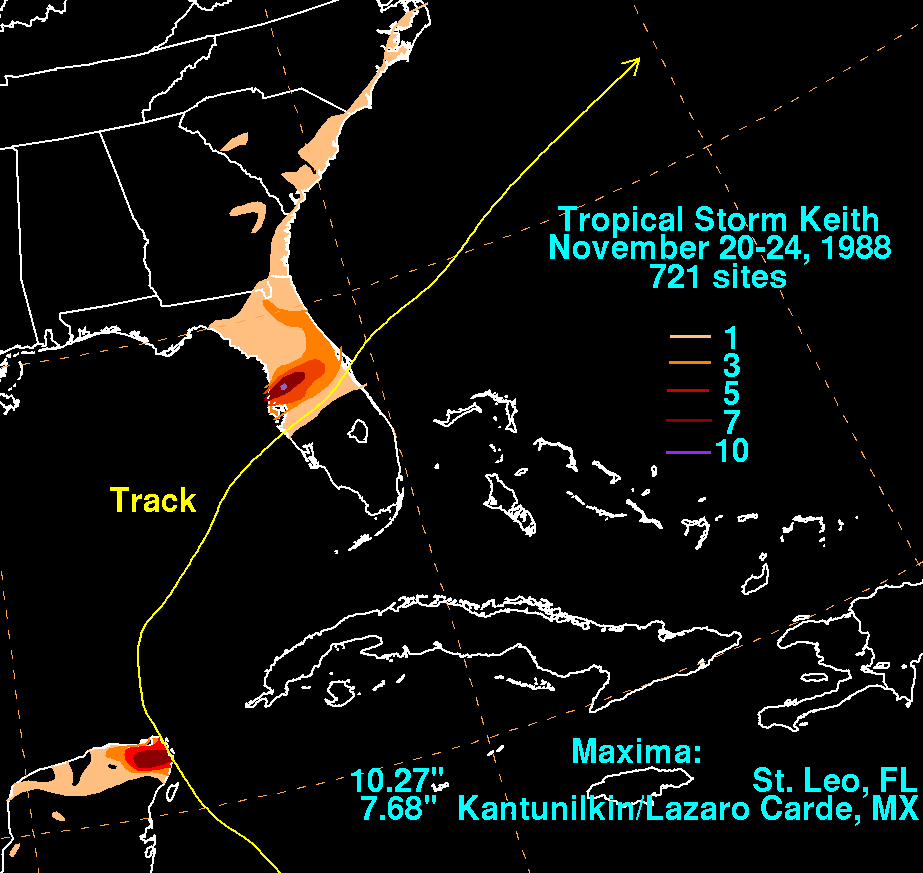
Rainfall data for Keith

Keith dropped around 3 inches (76 mm) of rainfall along the northern coast of Honduras, and totals of around 10 inches (250 mm) were reported on offshore islands. As the storm was making landfall on Mexico, a ship just west of Cozumel reported wind gusts of 90 mph (140 km/h), while a second ship in Puerto Morelos, Quintana Roo, recorded sustained winds of 70 mph (110 km/h). Reports from Cozumel indicated torrential rainfall and a large number of lightning strikes during the period of highest winds. Rainfall peaked at 7.69 inches (195 mm) just south of Cancún. Still recovering from the effects of Hurricane Gilbert two months prior, the Yucatán Peninsula received only minor damage as a result of Keith. The storm triggered flooding in western Cuba that severely damaged tobacco and vegetable crops. Officials forced 2,500 residents to evacuate their homes due to the flooding. The storm also dropped nearly 4 inches (100 mm) of precipitation in Kingston, Jamaica.

Off the coast of Florida, a freighter and its crew of ten were stranded after the storm flooded its engine room. The cyclone produced a moderately strong storm surge in isolated locations along the southwest coast of Florida, peaking at 5.94 feet (1.81 m) at Bradenton and Fort Myers Beach. The combination of storm surge and waves severely eroded beaches along Charlotte Harbor and Estero Bay. In Naples, strong waves destroyed the western end of the Naples Pier where several boats were washed ashore. Heavy precipitation fell to the north of the center, peaking at 10.27 inches (261 mm) in Saint Leo. Sustained winds peaked at 63 mph (101 km/h) at the MacDill Air Force Base, with stronger gusts. Inland from the immediate coastline, damage was mostly limited to isolated fresh-water flooding, downed trees, and power outages; overall damage was widespread but fairly light, and six structures were destroyed across the state. Before moving ashore, Keith spawned two tornadoes, one of which damaged approximately 30 mobile homes in Clermont. In Lakeland, a washed out track derailed a 34-car train, which broke a natural gas line and forced 450 people to evacuate. In Lee County, damage totaled $1.5 million (1988 USD; $4.08 million 2026 USD), and in Pinellas County the storm caused about $5.8 million in damage (1988 USD; $15.8 million 2026 USD).

A light storm surge of 1 to 2 feet (0.30 to 0.61 m) was reported along the northeast Florida coast into southeastern Georgia. The storm's outer rainbands dropped light rainfall of around 1 inch (25 mm) across coastal Florida, northward to North Carolina. A station on Bermuda reported sustained winds of 47 mph (76 km/h), with gusts to 78 mph (126 km/h). Only light damage occurred on the island.

== See also ==
- List of Bermuda hurricanes
- List of Florida hurricanes (1975–1999)
- Other storms of the same name
