= List of storms named Keith =

The name Keith has been used for four tropical cyclones worldwide: two in the Atlantic Ocean, one in the Western Pacific Ocean, and one in the Australian region.

In the Atlantic:

- Tropical Storm Keith (1988) – affected Central America and Florida, causing $7.3 million in damage
- Hurricane Keith (2000) – Category 4 hurricane that caused extensive damage in Central America, particularly in Belize and Mexico

The name Keith was retired following the 2000 season due to the extensive damages and loss of life it caused along its track. It was replaced with Kirk for the 2006 season, but was first used in 2012.

In the Western Pacific:

- Typhoon Keith (1997) – super typhoon which affected Guam and the Northern Mariana islands, causing $15 million in damage

In the Australian region:

- Cyclone Keith (1977)
