= 1922 Atlantic hurricane season =

- Season summary map

Seasonal boundaries
- First system formed: May 12, 1922
- Last system dissipated: October 31, 1922

Strongest storm
- Name: Two
  - Maximum winds: 120 mph (195 km/h) (1-minute sustained)
  - Lowest pressure: 960 mbar (hPa; 28.35 inHg)

Seasonal statistics
- Total depressions: 14
- Total storms: 5
- Hurricanes: 3
- Major hurricanes (Cat. 3+): 1
- Total fatalities: ≥105
- Total damage: At least $2.25 million (1922 USD)

Related articles
- 1920–24 Pacific hurricane seasons; 1920–1937 Pacific typhoon seasons; 1920s North Indian Ocean cyclone seasons

The 1922 Atlantic hurricane season was the first season since 1914 in which no hurricanes made landfall in the United States. Although no "hurricane season" was defined at the time, the present-day delineation of such is June 1 to November 30. The first system, a tropical depression, developed on May 12, while the last, also a tropical depression, dissipated on October 31. Of note, seven of the fourteen cyclones co-existed with another tropical cyclone during the season, including three systems being simultaneously active on September 22.

Of the season's fourteen tropical cyclones, five became tropical storms and three strengthened into hurricanes. Furthermore, one of those strengthened into a major hurricane—Category 3 or higher on the modern-day Saffir–Simpson hurricane wind scale. One of the hurricanes was found in reanalysis in 2009. The most intense tropical cyclone, Hurricane Two, peaked as a Category 3 hurricane with maximum sustained winds of 120 mph (190 km/h). Although a small hurricane in terms of size, this cyclone brought strong winds and rough seas to Bermuda while nearly striking the island, leading to one death and about $250,000 (1922 USD) in damage. Earlier in the season, the early stages and precursor of Tropical Storm One caused extensive flooding in El Salvador in June, leading to at least 100 deaths. The storm and its remnants later caused flooding along the lower Rio Grande. Crop damages alone on the Texas side of the river totaled about $2 million. Although no specific death toll is known, several bodies were seen floating down the river. In October, Hurricane Four caused severe damage and a few fatalities along the coast of the Yucatán Peninsula.

The season's activity was reflected with an accumulated cyclone energy (ACE) rating of 55, below the 1921–1930 average of 76.6. ACE is a metric used to express the energy used by a tropical cyclone during its lifetime. Therefore, a storm with a longer duration will have high values of ACE. It is only calculated at six-hour increments in which specific tropical and subtropical systems are either at or above sustained wind speeds of 39 mph (63 km/h), which is the threshold for tropical storm intensity. Thus, tropical depressions are not included here.

== Systems ==
=== Tropical Storm One ===
- Tropical storm (SSHWS)
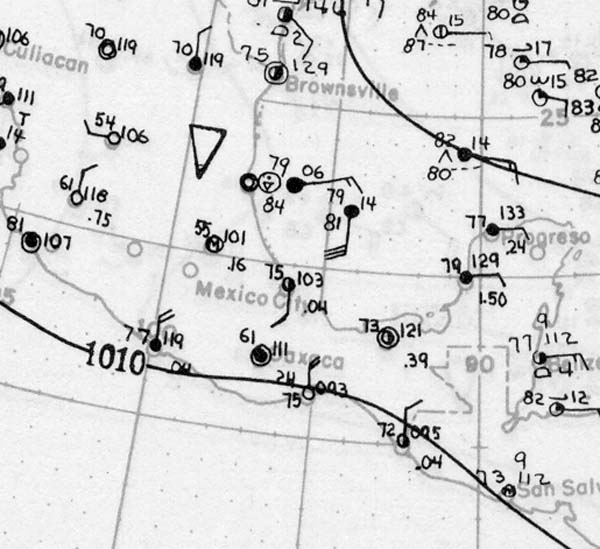
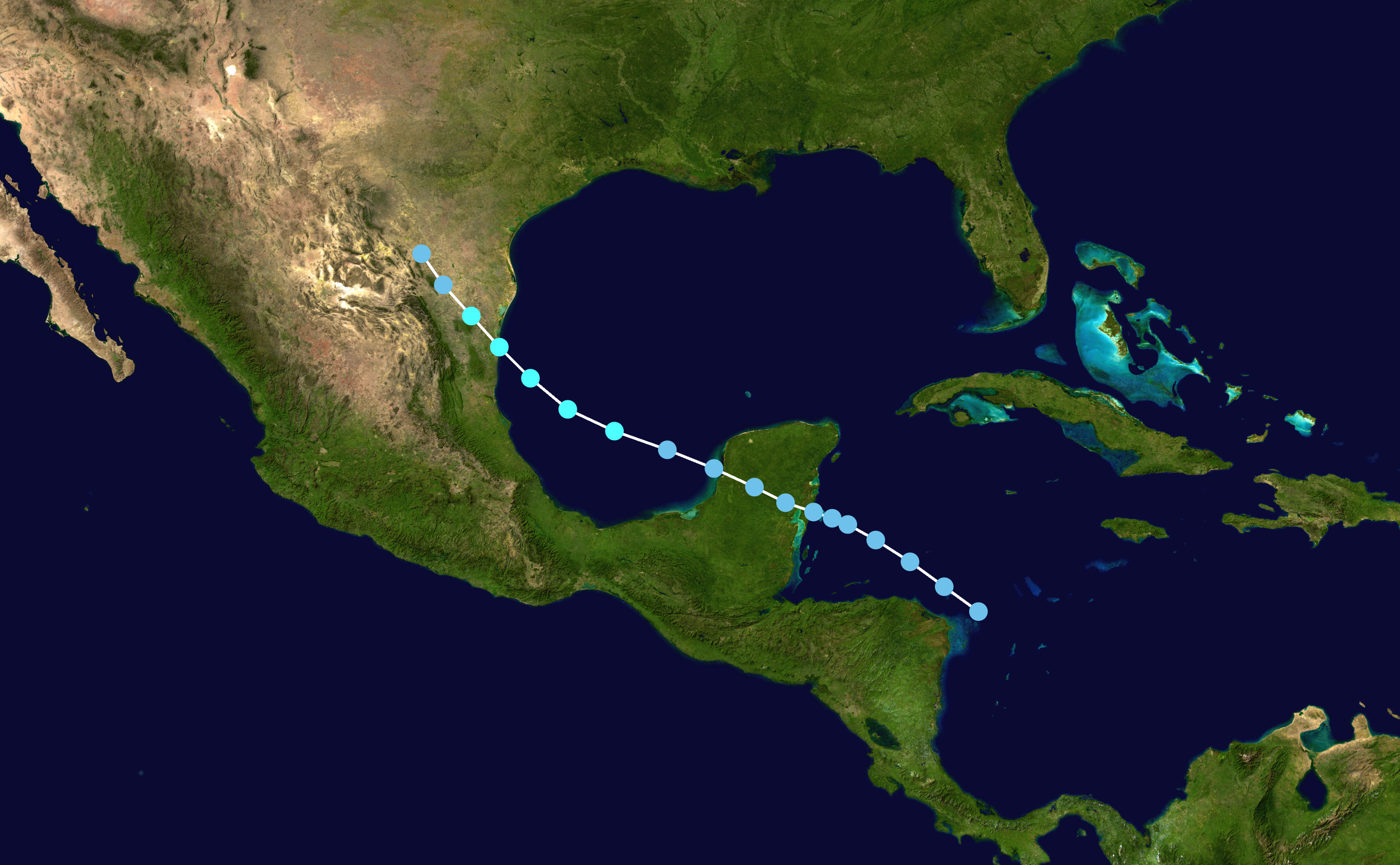
- Duration: June 12 – June 16
- Peak intensity: 50 mph (85 km/h) (1-min); 1003 mbar (hPa)

Observations from ships indicated that a tropical depression developed offshore Cabo Gracias a Dios, Nicaragua, on June 12. The depression continued northwestward without significantly intensifying. Heavy rains fell in the Swan Islands of Honduras on June 12 and June 13. Early on June 14, the depression made landfall in Mahahual, Quintana Roo, with winds of 35 mph (56 km/h). The cyclone entered the Gulf of Mexico later that day and began strengthening, reaching tropical storm status early on June 15. Around 18:00 UTC, the storm peaked with maximum sustained winds of 50 mph (80 km/h) and a minimum barometric pressure of 1,003 mbar (29.6 inHg). The system struck near La Pesca, Tamaulipas, at the same intensity early on June 16. After moving inland, the storm quickly weakened and dissipated by 18:00 UTC.

In the precursor and early stages of the storm, heavy rains fell in El Salvador. The Acelhuate River overflowed, flooding four densely populated neighborhoods in the capital city of San Salvador. The floodwaters destroyed or damaged homes, buildings, bridges, and other infrastructure, while killing hundreds of animals and at least 100 people. The storm and its remnants brought heavy rainfall to Rio Grande valley, causing flooding. In Texas, the river at Eagle Pass reached 45.6 ft (13.9 m), 29.6 ft (9.0 m) above flood stage. Two bridges washed away, while businesses and homes were damaged. Farther down the river, the swollen crest of the Rio Grande and San Juan rivers merged, causing significant flooding in Cameron and Hidalgo counties. Many towns in both counties suffered severe damage. It was estimated that damage to crops alone reached about $2 million. On the Mexico side of the river, water inundated more than 30,000 acres (12,000 ha) of agricultural lands. Infrastructure such as roads, bridges, railroads, and buildings were damaged. Telegraph reports noted that several bodies were seen floating down the Rio Grande at Ciudad Mier. Floodwaters stranded nearly 1,000 farmers in both countries. Aviators acting on behalf of the Red Cross dropped bags of food to those left isolated.

=== Hurricane Two ===
- Category 3 hurricane (SSHWS)
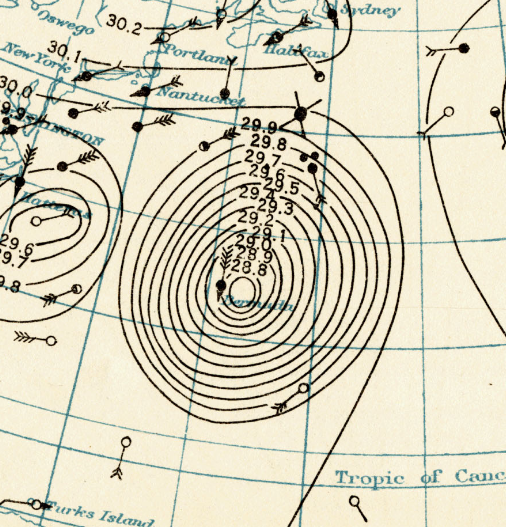
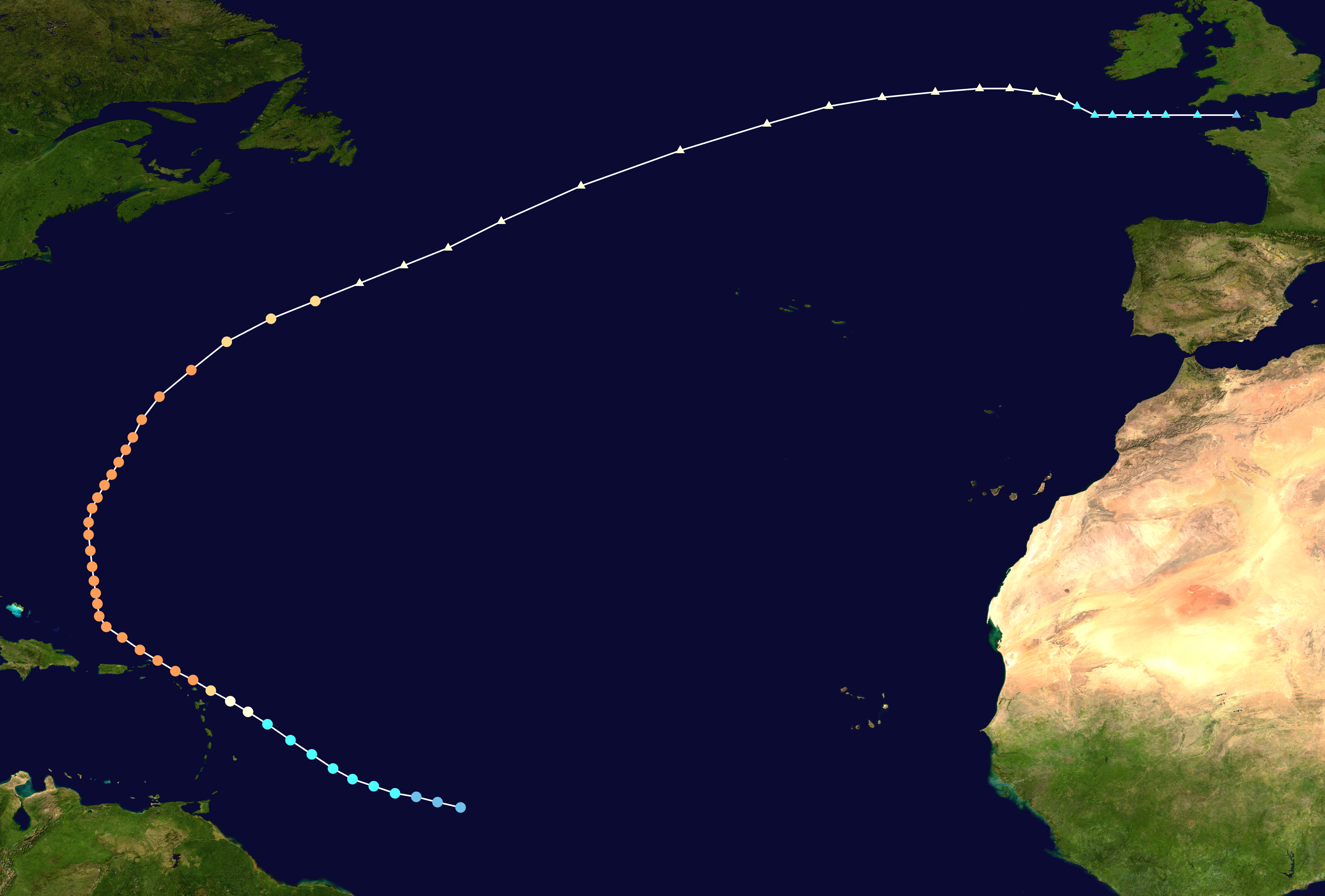
- Duration: September 13 – September 22
- Peak intensity: 120 mph (195 km/h) (1-min); 960 mbar (hPa)

A northeast-southwest oriented trough developed into a tropical depression about 870 mi (1,400 km) east-southeast of Barbados early on September 13. Initially moving west-northwestward, the depression intensified into a tropical storm several hours later, before curving northwestward the next day. The French S. S. Mont Rose was the first ship to encounter the storm, then centered about 200 mi (320 km) east of Martinique on September 15. Thereafter, the cyclone strengthened significantly, becoming a hurricane around 12:00 UTC and then reaching major hurricane intensity by 06:00 UTC on September 16. The cyclone strengthened slightly over the next few days, with sustained winds peaking at 120 mph (190 km/h) on September 17. By later that day, the system curved northward while centered north of the Mona Passage. Early on September 20, the hurricane began moving north-northeastward. Around 12:00 UTC on September 21, the hurricane passed almost directly over Bermuda while still at major hurricane intensity. The storm began accelerating and weakening later on September 21. By 00:00 UTC on September 23, the system became extratropical about 510 mi (820 km) south of Cape Race, Newfoundland. The remnants slowly weakened while approaching the British Isles, before dissipating over the English Channel on September 28.

The hurricane passed very close to Barbuda, with the island recording sustained winds of 81 mph (130 km/h), destroying 57 residences and damaging 107 others. Approximately 700 people on Anguilla were rendered homeless. Winds peaked at 120 mph (190 km/h) on Bermuda, causing severe damaged, while the coast experienced a storm surge reaching 8 ft (2.4 m) in height, the highest tides observed on the island since the hurricane of 1899. The abnormally high tides flooded numerous homes and streets near the harbor, including the Flatts Bridge. One death occurred at the dockyard after a sailor fell overboard from the H.M.S. Capetown, which was anchored there. Winds severely damaged a number of buildings, including the Bermuda Cathedral and the old City Hall in Hamilton. Debris littered the streets, including fallen trees and toppled walls. Repairs costs to government buildings was estimated at $221,209, with the overall damage reaching approximately $250,000. Several locations in Western Europe recorded mostly light wind speeds in association with the remnants of the storm.

=== Hurricane Three ===
- Category 1 hurricane (SSHWS)
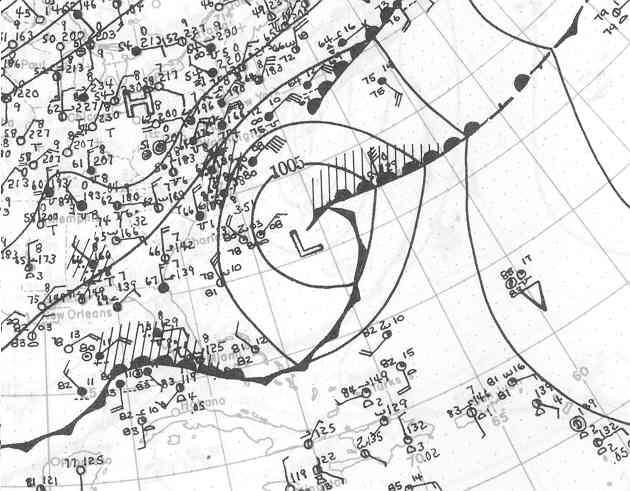
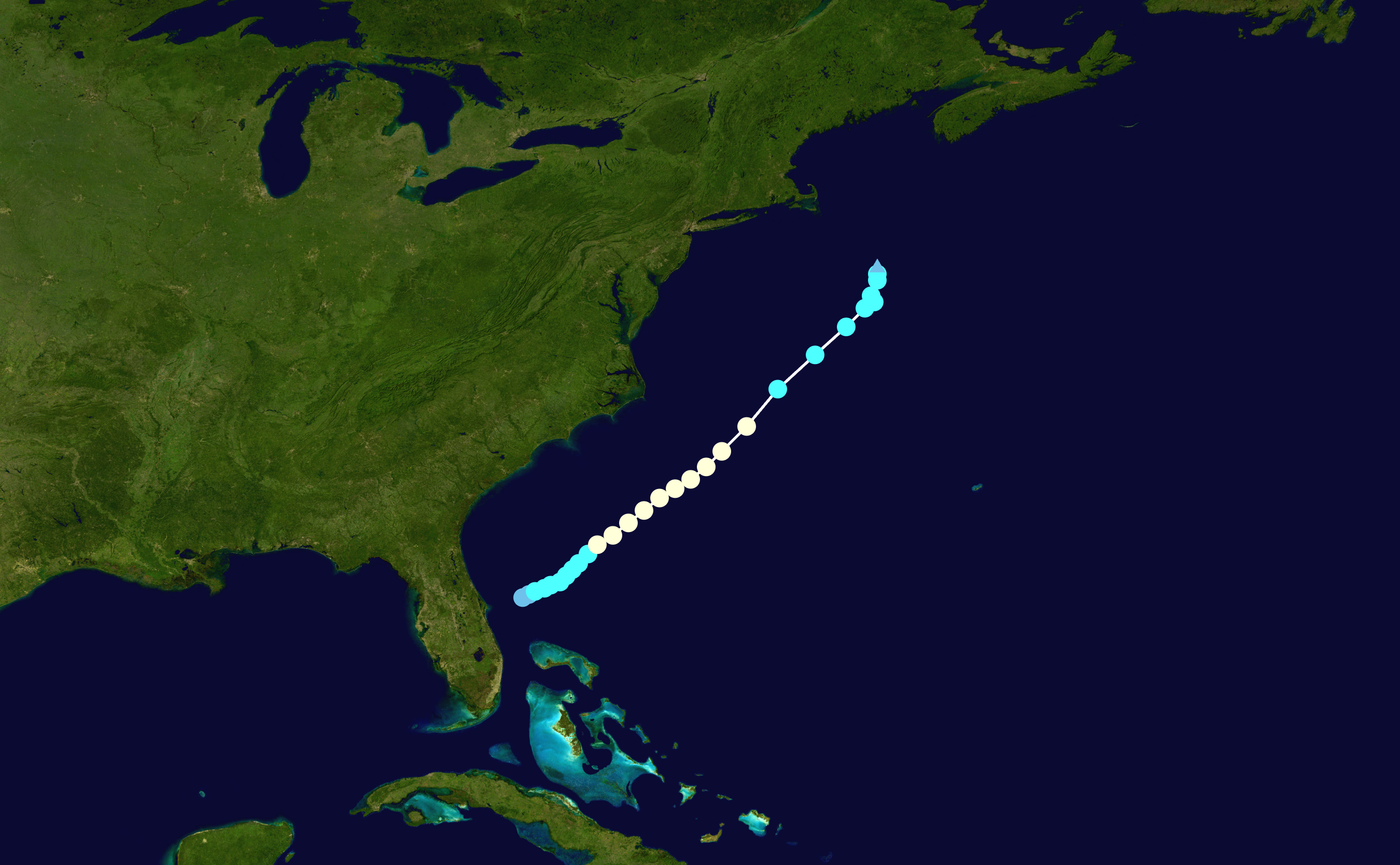
- Duration: September 18 – September 24
- Peak intensity: 80 mph (130 km/h) (1-min); 987 mbar (hPa)

A low pressure area developed into a tropical depression about 75 mi (121 km) east of Florida at 00:00 UTC on September 18. It is estimated that the depression reached tropical storm intensity about 12 hours later, based on ships reporting near-tropical storm force winds. The storm drifted northeast and slowly strengthened, becoming a hurricane on September 20. The system made have interacted with the previous storm, which was at Category 3 intensity and located near Bermuda on September 21. Intensifying slightly further, the hurricane peaked with maximum sustained winds of 80 mph (130 km/h) and a minimum barometric pressure of 987 mbar (29.1 inHg) at 12:00 UTC on September 22, with both estimated using observations from a ship and the pressure-wind relationship. However, by September 23, the cyclone weakened to a tropical storm. After briefly accelerating, the storm curved northward and drifted, before being absorbed by an extratropical storm about 165 mi (266 km) southeast of Massachusetts by 00:00 UTC on September 25. This hurricane was not considered a tropical cyclone until reanalysis in 2009. Tropical storm force winds were reported in Florida, North Carolina, and New Jersey.

=== Hurricane Four ===
- Category 2 hurricane (SSHWS)
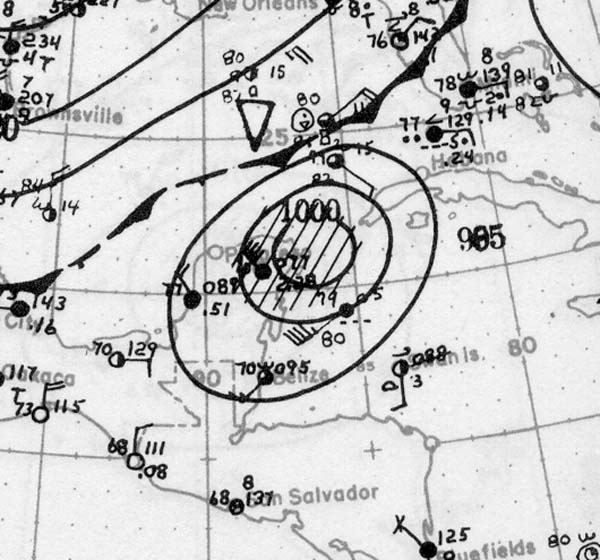
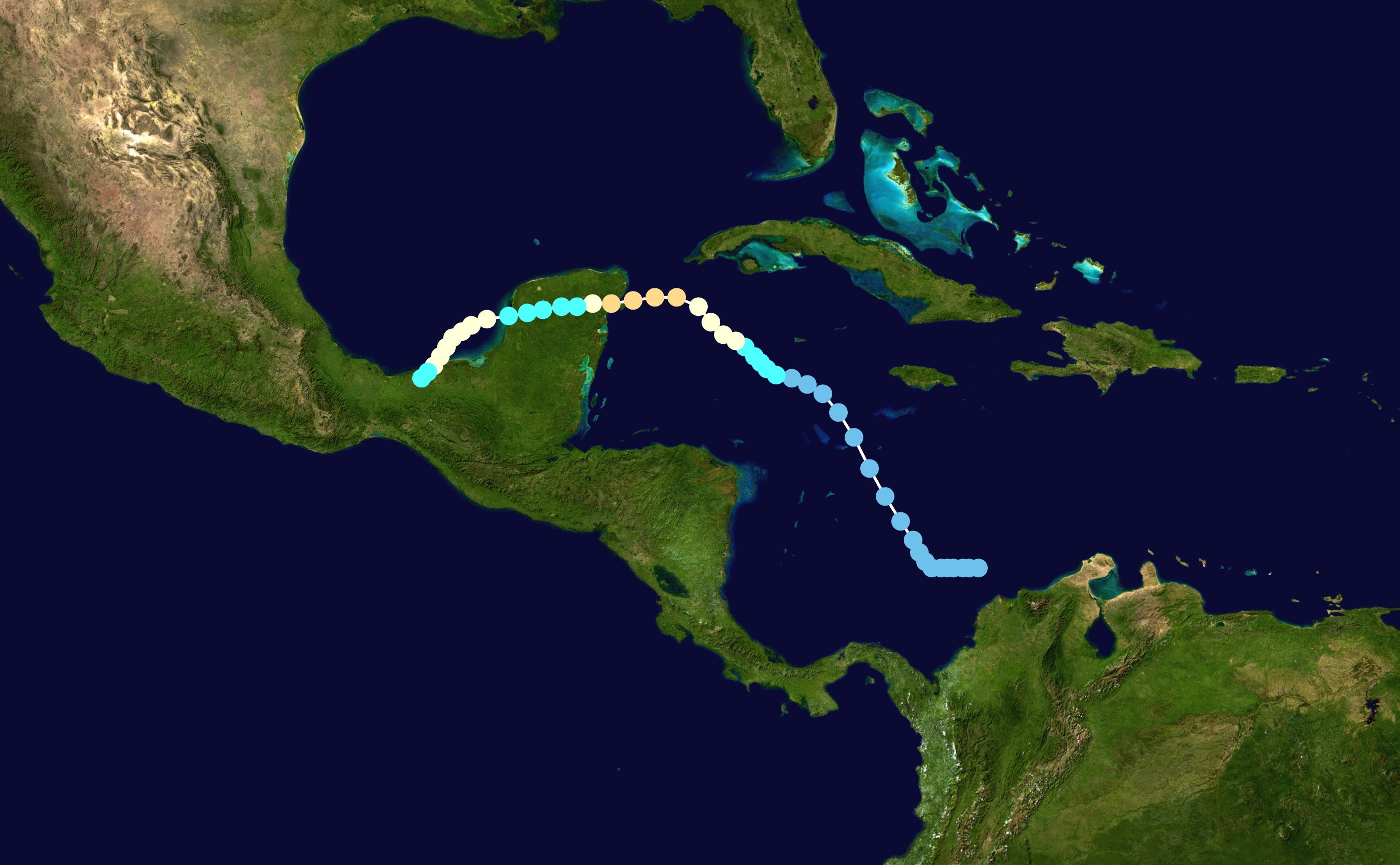
- Duration: October 11 – October 22
- Peak intensity: 110 mph (175 km/h) (1-min); <984 mbar (hPa)

Historical weather maps suggest that a tropical depression developed about 85 mi (135 km) north-northwest of Barranquilla, Colombia, early on October 11. The depression moved slowly westward and then northwestward without significant intensification for a few days. By October 15, the depression had reached tropical storm status. Late on October 16, the cyclone began intensifying at a quicker pace, becoming the equivalent of a modern-day Category 2 hurricane on October 17. Around 00:00 UTC the next day, it peaked with maximum sustained winds of 110 mph (180 km/h). Early on October 18, a ship reported a minimum pressure of 984 mbar (29.1 inHg) near the center, the lowest pressure measured during the life span of the storm.

The hurricane weakened slightly prior to making landfall near Playa del Carmen, Quintana Roo, with winds of 100 mph (160 km/h) around 12:00 UTC on October 18. Crossing the Yucatán Peninsula, the cyclone weakened to a tropical storm by 00:00 UTC the next day. Early on October 20, the storm emerged into the Bay of Campeche and quickly re-strengthened into a hurricane. The system then drifted slowly south-southwestward. Shortly after 18:00 UTC on October 21, the hurricane made landfall near Paraíso, Tabasco, with winds of 80 mph (130 km/h). The storm rapidly weakened after moving inland and dissipated near Cárdenas by 06:00 UTC the next day.

The storm's precursor caused extensive damage to banana plantations in the Magdalena Department of Colombia. In Quintana Roo, the storm caused significant damage to property and crops along the entire coast, while Cozumel and Isla Mujeres were reportedly left desolate. The hurricane destroyed nearly every home on the latter. A few fatalities occurred in the Yucatán Peninsula. Yucatán governor Felipe Carrillo Puerto estimated that damaged totaled about 60,000 MX$. Several small vessels sank offshore, including the motor canoe Nieves, drowning one passenger. The sloop Rosita also capsized, with only one crewman surviving. About two weeks after the storm, the federal government distributed about 50 tons of corn and 10 tons of beans to the destitute residents. Farther west, several fishing vessels sank and some ocean liners, including the Morro Castle, were stranded outside Veracruz harbor because violent seas made it too dangerous to enter. The hurricane caused considerable damage to shipping in the southern Gulf of Mexico.

=== Tropical Storm Five ===
- Tropical storm (SSHWS)
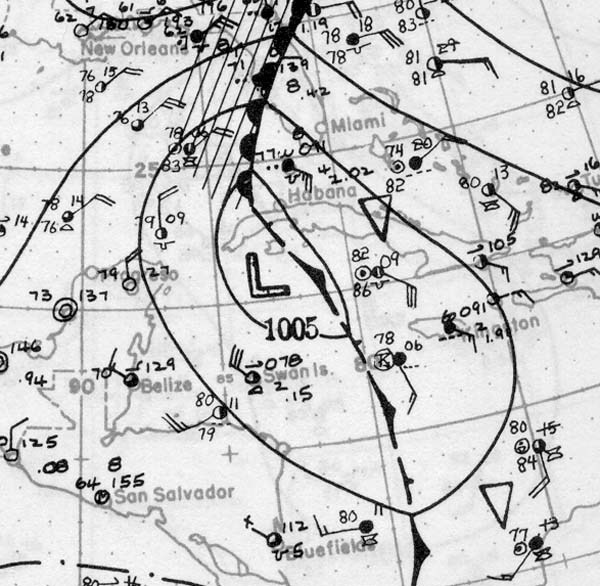
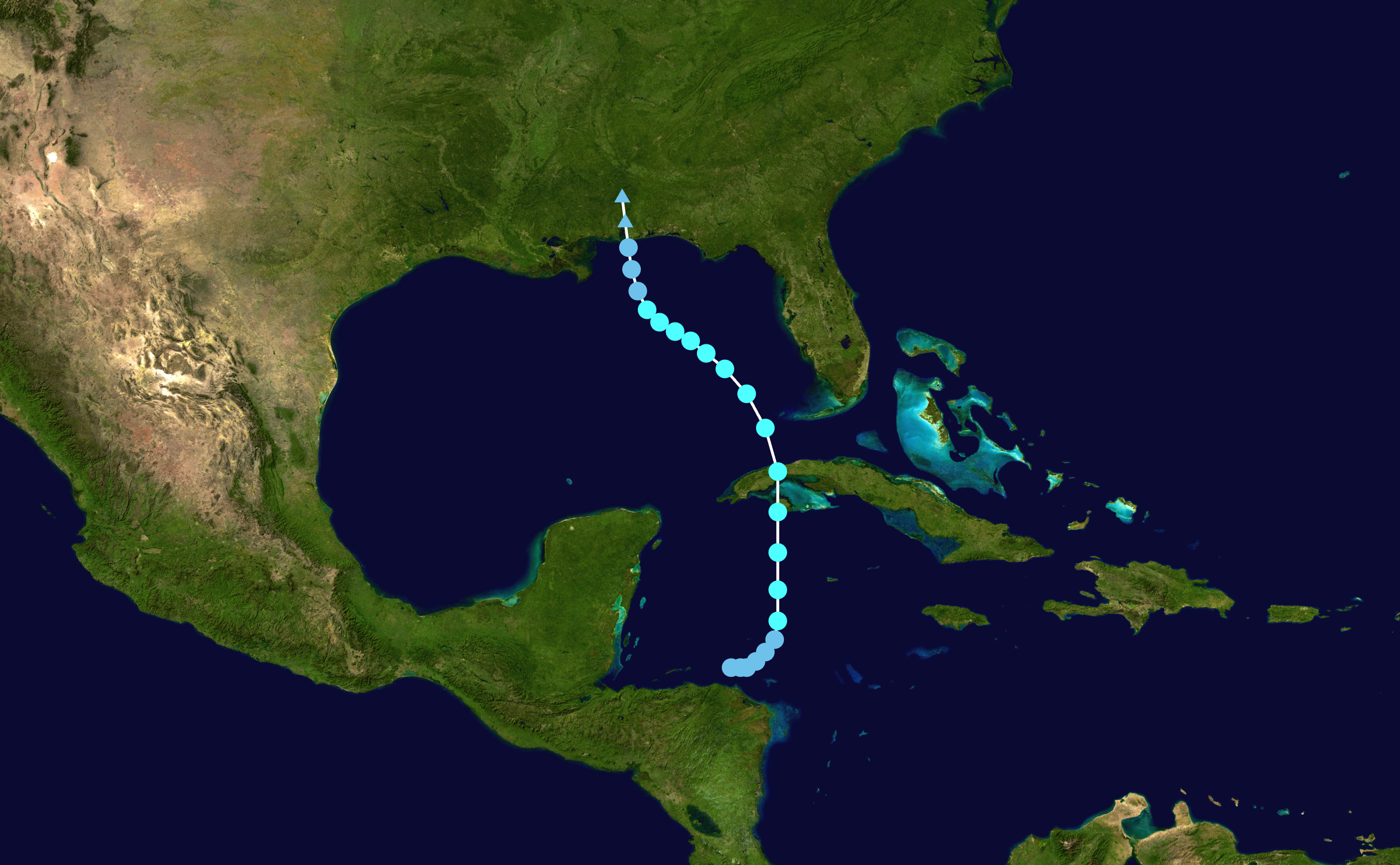
- Duration: October 12 – October 17
- Peak intensity: 50 mph (85 km/h) (1-min); <1000 mbar (hPa)

A low-pressure area previously associated with a frontal boundary developed into a tropical depression just north of Honduras on October 12. Initially moving northeastward, the depression intensified into a tropical storm around 12:00 UTC on October 13 and then began heading northward. Around 06:00 UTC on October 14, the storm made landfall on Isla de la Juventud, Cuba, with winds of 40 mph (64 km/h), shortly before striking modern-day Artemisa Province at the same intensity. After emerging into the Gulf of Mexico, the storm intensified further, peaking with winds of 50 mph (80 km/h) early on October 15. The cyclone then decelerated and weakened, falling to tropical depression status by late the following day. Around 09:00 UTC on October 17, it made landfall near Orange Beach, Alabama, with winds of 30 mph (48 km/h). The storm quickly lost tropical characteristics and was absorbed by a frontal boundary several hours later. It may have been a subtropical storm due to some hybrid characteristics. The system left minimal impact in Cuba and the Gulf Coast of the United States.

=== Tropical depressions ===
In addition to the five cyclones reaching at least tropical storm intensity, nine other tropical depressions formed during the season. A trough moving westward through the southwestern Caribbean developed into a tropical depression on May 12. The depression moved northwestward for a few days and failed to intensify. It made landfall in Nicaragua on May 15 and dissipated later that day. On June 14, a low-pressure area developed along the tail-end of a frontal boundary just offshore northeast Florida. By the following day, the low acquired tropical characteristics and likely became a tropical depression. The depression moved generally eastward and dissipated on June 16. A tropical wave developed into a tropical depression just southwest of the Cape Verde Islands on August 1. The depression moved slowly northward and then north-northeastward, before dissipating on August 3 about 60 mi (97 km) south of São Vicente. On August 17, a tropical depression developed in the eastern Gulf of Mexico. Moving northeastward, the system struck Florida, before emerging in the Atlantic on August 18. The storm moved along the East Coast of the United States and transitioned into an extratropical cyclone by August 20. Its remnants crossed Nova Scotia later that day and Newfoundland on the following day.

A weak circulation developed along the axis of a trough situated offshore North Carolina in early September, with a tropical depression forming on September 3. The depression moved southward and likely dissipated by the next day. An inverted trough and a tropical wave merged and briefly developed into a tropical depression well offshore Georgia on September 11. By the next day, the circulation had either dissipated or merged with a cold front. A strong tropical wave developed into a tropical depression between the Cape Verde Islands and Senegal on September 21. Moving generally westward, the depression was last noted between the islands of Fogo and Santiago on September 22. The latter island observed sustained winds of 36 mph (58 km/h). On October 2, a tropical depression likely formed over the eastern Gulf of Mexico about 280 mi (450 km) south of Panama City, Florida. The depression continued westward and may have made landfall in Texas just north of Corpus Christi on October 5. However, there is no evidence of a closed circulation beyond October 3. A tropical depression – possibly subtropical – formed on October 28 over the central Gulf of Mexico. The depression moved northward and made landfall near the Alabama–Mississippi state line on October 31 and quickly dissipated. Pensacola, Florida, recorded a 5-minute wind gust of 43 mph (69 km/h). The depression dropped mostly light rainfall in the area, with 24-hour amounts ranging from 0.5–1 in (13–25 mm).

== See also ==
- 1900–1940 South Pacific cyclone seasons
- 1900–1950 South-West Indian Ocean cyclone seasons
- 1920s Australian region cyclone seasons
