= 1810s Atlantic hurricane seasons =

The decade of the 1810s featured the 1810s Atlantic hurricane seasons. While data is not available for every storm that occurred, some parts of the coastline were populated enough to give data of hurricane occurrences. Each season was an ongoing event in the annual cycle of tropical cyclone formation in the Atlantic basin. Most tropical cyclone formation occurs between June 1 and November 30.

== 1810 Atlantic hurricane season ==
=== Tropical Storm One ===
On July 30 and July 31, this tropical storm affected Jamaica.

=== Hurricane Two ===
On August 12 a hurricane hit Trinidad, causing heavy damage. The system apparently moved to Jamaica by the 15th.

=== Tropical Storm Three ===
A tropical storm hit near Charleston, South Carolina between September 11 and September 13, causing minor damage.

=== Hurricane Four ===
A hurricane strikes eastern Cuba on September 28.

=== Hurricane Five ===
The "Salty Storm" strikes Cuba on October 24 and 25th before continuing onward into the southwest Atlantic. The pressure at Havana falls to 29.35 in Hg (994 hPa).

== 1811 Atlantic hurricane season ==
=== Hurricane One ===
Macapá, a city in Brazil on the mouth of the Amazon River, on June 7, 1811, saw an intense hurricane with damage to the city being minor as a localized weather event kept the damage to Portuguese military installations.

=== Hurricane Two ===
A minimal hurricane that struck Cuba continued onward to Charleston, South Carolina on September 10, causing many deaths, tornadoes, and crop damage as it moved across the state.

=== Hurricane Three ===
On October 4 a major hurricane hit near St. Augustine, Florida. Many homes were destroyed, and 35 people drowned in the sinking of a U.S. gunboat.

=== Hurricane Four ===
On October 11 a hurricane strikes Pensacola, Florida and Fort Stoddard, Alabama.

=== Hurricane Five ===
A hurricane moved through the western Caribbean west of Jamaica to Cuba between October 20 and October 25. On October 26, a Spanish ship is lost at Elliot Key from a hurricane.

== 1812 Atlantic hurricane season ==
=== Tropical Storm One ===
Between June 5 and June 11, a tropical storm moved through the northwest Caribbean Sea.

=== Tropical Storm Two ===
A tropical storm struck Puerto Rico on July 23.

=== Tropical Storm Three ===
On August 8, a tropical storm moved into South Carolina.

=== The Great Louisiana hurricane of 1812 ===
A tropical storm was sighted east of Jamaica on August 14. By August 19, it struck southeast Louisiana as a major hurricane after raking the Caribbean Islands. It passed just to the west of New Orleans, almost destroying the levee north of town. The hurricane caused severe flooding, damaged 53 boats, caused $6,000,000 in damage, and 100 deaths. The British fleet in the War of 1812 was disrupted.

=== Hurricane Five ===
There is record of another hurricane affecting Puerto Rico on August 21.

=== Hurricane Six ===
A hurricane impacted northeast coastal Florida and lower coastal Georgia on October 1. The storm was apparently either stationary for a few days, or performed a loop at sea, as hurricane conditions were reported again on October 5 in the same general areas.

=== Hurricane Seven ===
Later in the season, a hurricane hit Jamaica on October 12, affecting the island into the 14th. It continued northwestward and struck Grand Cayman shortly afterwards. Later that day, the hurricane hit Cuba before moving into the southwest Atlantic east of Bermuda by October 17. It destroyed 500 houses and many ships.

== 1813 Atlantic hurricane season ==
=== Hurricane One ===
July 22–29. On 22 July, a hurricane hit Barbados, killing 18. It continued through the Antilles, affecting Puerto Rico on the July 23, causing more damage and deaths along its path. A major hurricane, probably this same storm, struck the Bahamas on July 26 and recurved west of Bermuda by July 29.

=== Hurricane Two ===
July 29-August 1. A hurricane moved through the Leeward Islands on July 29 and then struck Jamaica during July 31 and August 1 leading to many lives lost. The hurricane moved into Belize on August 3.

=== Hurricane Three ===
August 3–7. A hurricane strikes nearby Bermuda with the severest weather occurring on August 4 and 5. It ranks the most powerful hurricane to affect the island since 1793 and forced the construction of a breakwater to prevent a similar harbor disaster from recurring; the "violent gale" drove ashore more than 30 ships. Winds were estimated at 90 mph (140 km/h) during the passage of the hurricane.

=== Hurricane Four ===
August 24–29. A storm affected the Caicos islands on August 24 and moved northwest as a compact major hurricane to strike near Charleston, South Carolina on August 27, causing many deaths due to drowning. The storm passed northward through the Mid-Atlantic States by August 29.

=== Hurricane Five ===
August 25–28. A powerful hurricane hit Dominica and Martinique beginning August 25, causing 3,000 deaths. The hurricane moved south of Jamaica, bringing wind to the island on August 28.

=== Hurricane Six ===
A major hurricane hit northeast Florida or southeast Georgia on 16 September, causing strong storm surge and 50 casualties.

=== Hurricane Seven ===
A hurricane hit Turks and Caicos Islands on September 24, 1813.

== 1814 Atlantic hurricane season ==
=== Hurricane One ===
A minimal hurricane hit South Carolina on July 1, causing 1 tornado.

=== Hurricane Two ===
A hurricane struck Dominica and Puerto Rico between July 22 and July 24.

=== Hurricane Three ===
A hurricane affected Bermuda for four days around October 10. USS Wasp probably lost in hurricane.

== 1815 Atlantic hurricane season ==
=== Hurricane One ===
July 27-August 10. A hurricane was reported on August 9 in the Gulf Stream offshore of the Mid-Atlantic and New England states at latitude 40, longitude -60. It is suspected that HMS Epervier (as the renamed USS Epervier) foundered in the storm, on its return voyage from the Mediterranean with news of the United States Naval victory over the Dey of Algiers in the Second Barbary War.

=== Hurricane Two ===
A hurricane impacted Puerto Rico on August 30.

=== Hurricane Three ===
August 26-September 5. Cape Lookout, North Carolina was hit by a major hurricane on September 3. It moved northeastward across the state, reaching the Atlantic Ocean near Maryland. It weakened over land to a tropical storm, but still brought gusty winds to New England. It caused at least 4 deaths.

=== Hurricane Four ===
A hurricane struck Puerto Rico on September 15.

=== Hurricane Five ===
September 16–23. A major hurricane was located off the coast of Virginia moving northward. It hit Long Island, New York on September 23, causing damage and destruction throughout New England. At least 20 deaths occurred, though "The loss of life was so heavy that the newspapers did not have space enough to give all the details of the marine disasters."

=== Tropical Storm Six ===
A tropical storm was located off the coast of South Carolina on September 28, but did not make landfall.

=== Hurricane Seven ===
October 18–22. From October 17 until October 19 Jamaica was hit by a hurricane. It drifted over the island causing 100 deaths. It later moved on to the Turks and Caicos Islands on October 22.

=== Hurricane Eight ===
A minimal hurricane hit Saint Barthélemy on October 18. It turned northwestward, and moved up the Chesapeake Bay on October 24, delaying ships' arrivals.

== 1816 Atlantic hurricane season ==
Records from ship logs have determined both 1815 and 1816 were active hurricane seasons, with at least 12 tropical cyclones ascribed to 1816 alone. This is some evidence that a northward-displaced Intertropical Convergence Zone appears to be partially responsible for the increased tropical cyclone activity in 1816, which was the famed Year Without a Summer.

=== Hurricane One ===
June 5–8. A hurricane brushed the Florida Keys, causing the loss of five ships. It appears to have been lured northward by an unusual June snowstorm across New England.

=== Hurricane Two ===
Haiti, around Port-au-Prince, was struck by a hurricane on August 18.

=== Hurricane Three ===
Martinique, eastern Cuba, and South Carolina were lashed by a hurricane between September 3 and September 11.

=== Tropical Storm Four ===
A tropical storm affected Virginia on September 18 before moving northeast into New York. The tropical storm caused heavy flooding in the James River area.

=== Hurricane Five ===
There is record of a hurricane moving by Dominica and Barbados on September 15 before devastating Puerto Rico on September 18. The cyclone then recurved between the United States East coast and Bermuda by September 25.

=== Hurricane Six ===
On October 16–17, a severe gale was experienced in Dominica and Martinique. During the storm, an earthquake shook the region.

== 1817 Atlantic hurricane season ==
=== Hurricane One ===
A hurricane was first observed near Tobago on August 1 before continuing through the Caribbean Sea and the Gulf of Mexico by August 6. It crossed over Florida, and when it reached the western Atlantic, it paralleled the coastlines of Georgia and South Carolina. It moved inland over southern North Carolina, and brought heavy rain to the Norfolk, Virginia area, delaying mail delivery and causing flooding through the mid-Atlantic as it moved northward into Pennsylvania by August 9. Its track appears similar to that of Hurricane Charley of August 2004.

=== Hurricane Two ===
Barbados and Saint Lucia were struck by a hurricane on October 21, causing 250 deaths as it moved through the Lesser Antilles. The hurricane subsequently moved into Nicaragua by October 26.

== 1818 Atlantic hurricane season ==
=== Hurricane One ===
A hurricane passed through the central Atlantic east of Bermuda to south and east of the Azores between August 26 and September 5. It reportedly silted at Hamilton Harbor on Bermuda. (from Beware the Hurricane)

=== Hurricane Two ===
A hurricane passed by the Cayman Islands in early September. It crossed the Yucatán Peninsula, and turned northwest when it reached the Bay of Campeche. The hurricane intensified to a Category 2–3 before hitting Galveston, Texas on September 12 and continuing onward to Mississippi. The hurricane was "quite severe", destroying all but six houses on Galveston Island.

=== Hurricane Three ===
A hurricane seriously affected Puerto Rico on September 22. It possibly recurved sharply offshore the Eastern Seaboard; the frigate Macedonian encountered a hurricane on 26/27 September east-northeast of Bermuda. The breeze freshened that afternoon as the ship lay near 35.6N 55.7W. By sunset, waves increased to 9 feet (2.7 m), and southeast gales lashed the system after midnight on the 27 September. Winds continued to increase into that afternoon, as seas increased to 18 feet (5.5 m). One man fell overboard by 5 pm and drowned. The hurricane reached its full violence by 10 pm, splitting the storm staysails and making the rigging useless. The main mast cracked under the strain by 2 am on 28 September, and the mizzenmast followed suit by 4 am. Seawater poured into the ship from all sides, as the wooden hull twisted under the force of the 40-foot (12 m) waves. The ship finally cleared the storm without capsizing by noon, and her crew again saw sunset on the evening of September 29.

=== Hurricane Four ===
A hurricane on October 12–14 affected Jamaica and the central Bahamas.

=== Hurricane Five ===
Between November 6 and November 13, another hurricane moved across the southwest Caribbean Sea into Jamaica and Cuba. A hurricane struck Jamaica on 18–20 November.

== 1819 Atlantic hurricane season ==
=== Hurricane One ===
The Bay St. Louis Hurricane of 1819 July 24–30. The exact origin of this hurricane is unknown, but it likely formed off the coast of Cuba before heading on a west-northwest track towards the Gulf Coast. A small hurricane, it reached an estimated Category 3–4 strength before making landfall on July 27 in southeastern Louisiana, bringing heavy winds and a 5–6 ft storm surge. The hurricane continued northeastward, making a second landfall in Bay St. Louis, Mississippi before dissipating inland. Known as one of the most destructive hurricanes to affect the United States during the first half of the 19th century, the Bay St. Louis Hurricane caused severe damage across Alabama, Louisiana, and Mississippi, leaving behind the remains of shattered buildings and uprooted trees. Several vessels (from small boats to 60-ton brigs) were driven ashore by the hurricane's storm surge. One of them was the capsizing of the U.S. warship USS Firebrand, drowning 39 sailors. Several U.S. soldiers were caught off guard by the hurricane and perished in its midst. There were also reports of people being attacked by alligators, snapping turtles, and snakes, which further added to the death toll. The hurricane caused over $100,000 (1819 US dollars) in damage, and killed between 43 and 175 people, some of them later found washed up across the Gulf Coast.

=== Hurricane Two ===
The San Mateo Hurricane of 1819 September 19–26. A hurricane San Mateo tracked through the northeast Lesser Antilles and southwest of Bermuda starting on September 19. During September 21 and 22, this hurricane hit the Virgin Islands and Puerto Rico, causing heavy damage and loss of life. In Saint Tomas about 101 ships were sunk. In Puerto Rico, the hurricane destroyed most of the houses in the towns and most of the crops in the fields.

=== Tropical Storm Three ===
September. A tropical storm hit between New Orleans and Apalachicola in September, with heavy rainfall well inland.

=== Hurricane Four ===
October 13–15. A hurricane passed through the Leeward Islands during October 13 to 15.

=== Hurricane Five ===
October 27–29. A hurricane is recorded to have struck Cuba on October 27 before moving onward to the Bahamas on October 28.

In the aftermath of the 1815 Great Gale, the concept of a hurricane as a "moving vortex" was presented by John Farrar, Hollis Professor of Mathematics and Natural Philosophy at Harvard University in an 1819 paper. He was the first known to conclude that a hurricane "appears to have been a moving vortex and not the rushing forward of a great body of the atmosphere".

== See also ==
- Atlantic hurricane season
