= Ernest =

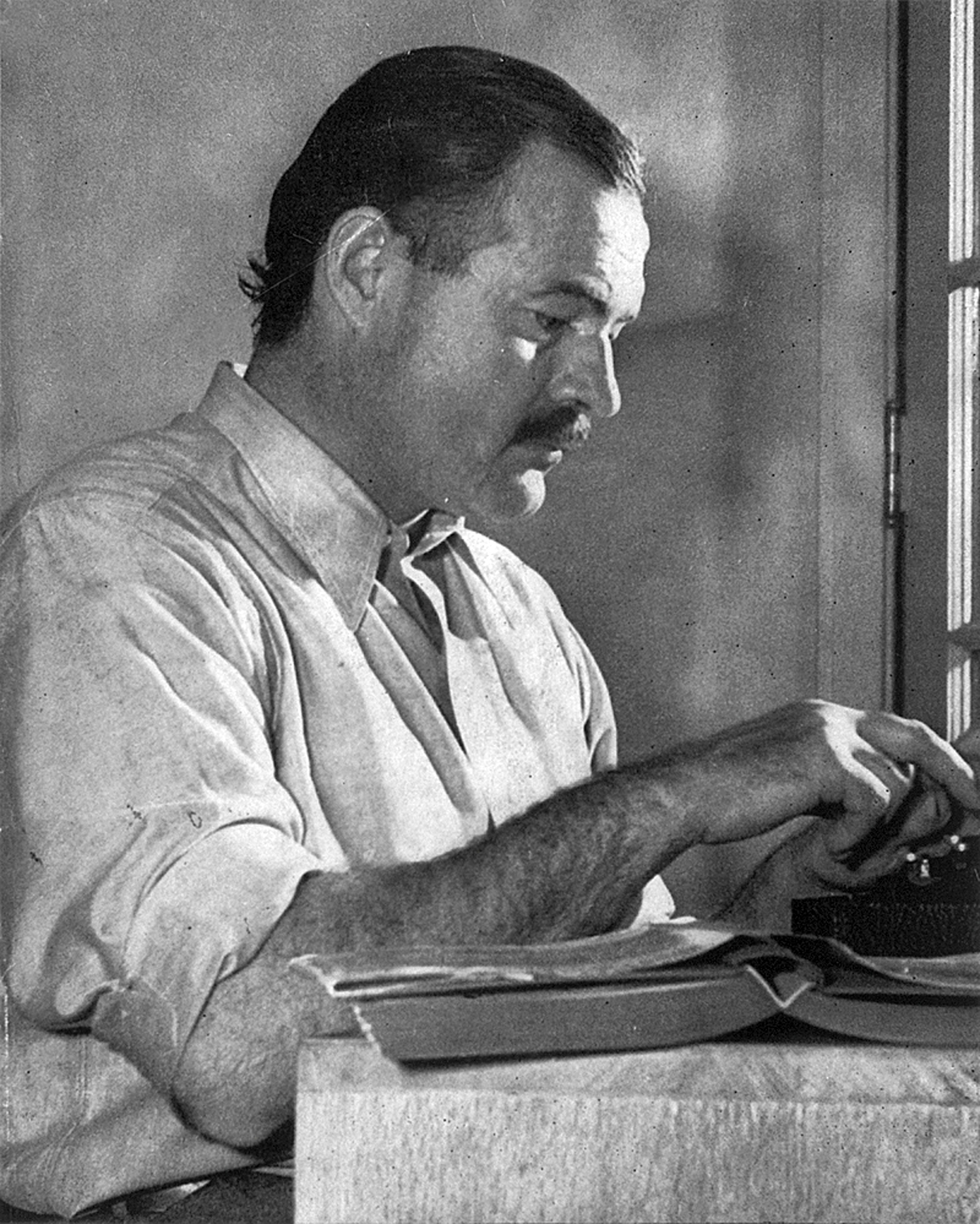
- Ernest Hemingway, one of the most famous bearers.
- Pronunciation: /ˈɜːrnɪst/
- Gender: male

Origin
- Origin: Germanic
- Meaning: earnest, serious, warrior
- Region of origin: Northern Europe, Central Europe

Other names
- Related names: Ernie (hypocorism); Ernestine, Erna (female forms); Ernst; Ernesto; Ernestas; Ernő

Ernest is a given name derived from the Germanic word ernst, meaning "serious", often shortened to Ernie.

Notable people and fictional characters with the name include:

== People ==
- Archduke Ernest of Austria (1553–1595), son of Maximilian II, Holy Roman Emperor
- Ernest, Margrave of Austria (1027–1075)
- Ernest, Duke of Bavaria (1373–1438)
- Ernest, Duke of Opava (c. 1415–1464)
- Ernest, Margrave of Baden-Durlach (1482–1553)
- Ernest, Landgrave of Hesse-Rheinfels (1623–1693)
- Ernest Augustus, Elector of Brunswick-Lüneburg (1629–1698)
- Ernest, Count of Stolberg-Ilsenburg (1650–1710)
- Ernest Augustus, King of Hanover (1771–1851), son of King George III of Great Britain
- Ernest II, Duke of Saxe-Coburg and Gotha (1818–1893), sovereign duke of the Duchy of Saxe-Coburg and Gotha
- Ernest Augustus, Crown Prince of Hanover (1845–1923)
- Ernest, Landgrave of Hesse-Philippsthal (1846–1925)
- Ernest Augustus, Prince of Hanover (1914–1987)
- Prince Ernst August of Hanover (born 1954)
- Prince Ernst August of Hanover (born 1983)
- Saint Ernest (died 1148), German abbot
- Ernest Adams (disambiguation)
- Ernest Guy Amsler (1895–1986), associate justice of the Arkansas Supreme Court
- Ernie Anderson (1923–1997), American radio and television announcer
- Ernie Banks (1931–2015), American baseball player
- Ernest Benach (born 1959), President of the Catalan parliament
- Ernest Bernea (1905–1990), Romanian sociologist
- Ernest Bevin (1881–1951), British Labour politician
- Ernest Bohr (1924–2018), Danish lawyer, former barrister, and field hockey player
- Ernest H. Bridge, American politician
- Ernest Broșteanu (1869–1932), Romanian general during World War I
- Ernest Buckmaster (1897–1968), Australian artist
- Ernest Radcliffe Bond (1919–2003), British police officer and soldier
- Ernie Bond (footballer) (born 1929), English footballer
- Ernie Bond (politician) (1897–1984), Australian politician
- Ernest Borgnine (1917–2012), American actor
- Ernie Calloway (born 1948), American football player
- Ernie Cooksey (1980–2008), English footballer
- Ernest Corea (1932–2017), Sri Lankan Sinhala journalist, Ambassador of Sri Lanka to the United States from 1981 to 1986
- Sir Ernest Marshall Cowell (1886–1971), British surgeon and military officer
- Ernie Cox (Canadian football) (1894–1962), Canadian football player
- Ernest S. Croot III (born 1972), American mathematician
- Ernest Dale (1917–1996), American academic and writer
- Ernest Daltroff (1867–1941), French perfumer, and founder of Parfums Caron
- Ernest de Munck (1840–1915), Belgian cellist and composer
- Ernest Dezentjé (1885–1972), Dutch-Indonesian painter
- Ernest Dickerson (born 1951), American director, cinematographer, and screenwriter
- Ernie DiGregorio (born 1951), American basketball player
- Ernest Duff (1931-2016), American businessman, lawyer and Mormon bishop
- Ernie Els (born 1969), South African golfer
- Ernest Evans (cricketer) (1861–1948), English cricketer who played for Somerset
- Ernest Evans (politician) (1885–1965), Welsh politician
- Ernest Everett Just (biologist) (1883-1941), American biologist
- Ernest E. Evans (1908–1944), officer of the United States Navy in WWII
- Ernest Peter Arnold Fernando (1919–1957), Sri Lankan Sinhala businessman and mine owner
- Ernie Fletcher (born 1952), American physician and politician, 60th Governor of Kentucky
- Tennessee Ernie Ford (1919–1991), American country singer
- Ernest Gold (composer) (1921–1999), American composer
- Ernest Gold (meteorologist) (1881–1976), British meteorologist
- Ernest Gjoka (born 1970), Albanian football coach
- Ernie Green (born 1938), American football player
- Ernesto "Che" Guevara (1928–1967), Argentine physician, author and Marxist revolutionary
- Ernest Gugenheim (1916–1977), French rabbi
- Ernie Harwell (1918–2010), American baseball broadcaster
- Ernest Haycox (1899–1950), American writer of Westerns
- Ernest Hemingway (1899–1961), American writer
- Ernest Hendricks, South African politician
- Ernest George Horlock (1885–1917), English recipient of the Victoria Cross
- E. W. Hornung (1866–1921), English author and poet
- Ernie Hughes (born 1955), American football player
- Ernie Isley (born 1952), American musician, the Isley Brothers
- Ernest Johnson (disambiguation), multiple people
- Ernest Jones (disambiguation), multiple people
- Ernest Juvara (1870–1933), Romanian physician
- Ernest Koliqi (1903–1975), Albanian writer
- Ernie Kovacs (1919–1962), American comedian, actor and writer
- Ernest Krausz (1931–2018), Israeli professor of sociology and President at Bar Ilan University
- Ernest Lawrence (1901–1958), American nuclear scientist
- Ernest Lluch (1937–2000), Catalan-Spanish politician
- Ernest Earl Lockhart (1912-2006), American chemist and explorer
- Ernest Millington (1916–2009), British politician
- Ernie Morgan (1927–2013), English football player and manager
- Ernie Nordli (1912–1968), American animation artist and graphic designer
- Ernest Perera (1932-2013, Inspector-General of Sri Lanka Police from 1988 to 1993
- Ernie Phythian (1942–2020), English footballer
- Ernest Victor Pieris (1926-1991), Sri Lankan Sinhala physician, medical educator, cricketer, and rugby union player
- Ernest Poruthota (1931–2020), Sri Lankan Sinhala Roman Catholic priest and author
- Ernest Prakasa (born 1982), Indonesian comedian, stand up performer, writer, and actor
- Ernie Price (1926–2013), English footballer
- Ernest Prodolliet (1905-1984), Swiss diplomat
- Ernst Reuter (1889–1953), German politician and mayor of Berlin
- Ernest Rutherford (1871–1937), New Zealand chemist and nuclear physicist
- Ernest Shackleton (1874–1922), Anglo-Irish explorer
- Ernest de Silva (1887–1957), Sri Lankan philanthropist
- Ernest (musician) (K. Smith), American country music artist
- Ernest Spybuck (1883–1949), American Indian autoethnographer
- Ernest Thayer (1863–1940), American poet
- Ernest William Tristram (1882-1952), British art historian, artist and conservator
- Ernest Troubridge (1862–1926), British naval officer
- Ernest Tubb (1914–1984), American country music singer and songwriter
- Ernest Veuve (1843–1916), American Civil War soldier
- Ernest Vinberg (1937–2020), Russian mathematician
- Ernest Walker (disambiguation)
- Ernest Walton (1903–1995), Irish physicist and Nobel laureate
- Ernie Watts (born 1945), American saxophonist
- Ernie Watts (Small Heath footballer), English footballer
- Ernie Watts (footballer, born 1872) (1872–1???), English footballer
- Ernie Wise (1925–1999), stage name of English comedian Ernest Wiseman (1925–1999), Morecambe and Wise
- Ernest Ailred Worms (1891–1963), German Pallottine missionary, linguist, and anthropologist in Australia
- Ernie Zalejski (1925–2012), American football player

== Fictional characters ==
- Ernest T. Bass, a recurring character on the American TV sitcom The Andy Griffith Show
- Ernest Denouement, a character in Lemony Snicket's A Series of Unfortunate Events
- Ernest le Vampire, main character form France animated series which is about vampire getting daymares.
- Monsieur Ernest LeClerc, on the BBC sitcom 'Allo 'Allo!
- Ernest P. Worrell, main comic character of the series of Ernest films as played by Jim Varney

== See also ==
- Ern (given name)
- Ernie, shortened version of Ernest
- Ernst
- Ernesto
- Earnest (disambiguation)
