= Ernestine =

Ernestine is a feminine given name. Ernest is the male counterpart of this name. Notable people with the name include:

- Ernestine Anderson (1928–2016), American jazz and blues singer
- Ernestine Bayer (1909–2006), American athlete
- Ernestine Bazemore (died 2025), American politician
- Ernestine Gilbreth Carey (1908–2006), American author
- Ernestine Cannon (1904–1969), American ceramicist
- Ernestine Carter (1906–1983), American journalist
- Ernestine Chassebœuf (1910–c.2005), French letter-writer
- Ernestine Cobern Beyer (1893–1972), American poet and author
- Ernestine Eckstein (1941–1992), American LGBT activist
- Ernestine von Fricken (1816–1844), Austrian pianist
- Ernestine Fuchs (1885–1962), German film actress, film producer, and screenwriter
- Ernestine Fu (born 1992), American venture capital investor and author
- Ernestine Hipper, German set decorator
- Ernestine de Lambriquet (1778–1813), the adopted/foster daughter of King Louis XVI and Queen Marie Antoinette of France
- Ernestine Leibovici (1918–1988), more commonly known as Eren Eyüboğlu, Romanian-born Turkish painter and mosaic artist
- Ernestine Mbakou, Cameroonian novelist
- Ernestine Nyoka, Congolese politician
- Ernestine Petras (1924–2017), American baseball player
- Ernestine von Pfeffel (1810–1894), second wife of the poet Fyodor Tyutchev
- Ernestine Ouandié (1961–2009), Cameroonian journalist
- Ernestine Rengiil, Palauan lawyer
- Ernestine Rose (1810–1892), Russian-American abolitionist and feminist
- Ernestine Rose (1880–1961), American librarian
- Ernestine Russell (1938–2026), Canadian gymnast and American college gymnastics coach
- Ernestine Jane Geraldine Russell (1921–2011), American actress, singer and model
- Ernestine Schumann-Heink (1861–1936), Austrian-German-American operatic contralto
- Ernestine Walkingstick (1937-1999), Eastern Band Cherokee nurse and community leader
- Ernestine H. Wieder Singer (1911–1938), American anthropologist and archaeologist

== Fictional characters ==
- Ernestine Tomlin, a fictional telephone company operator portrayed by Lily Tomlin
- Ernestine, a character in Dorothy Cannell's book The Importance of Being Ernestine
- Ernestine, the title character in L'Histoire d'Ernestine, a short novel from the 18th century written by Marie-Jeanne Riccoboni
- Ernestine, a character on Sesame Street

== See also ==
- Ernestine branch, a branch of the German House of Wettin
- Ernestine, a comic-opera by Choderlos de Laclos
