= Ernesto =

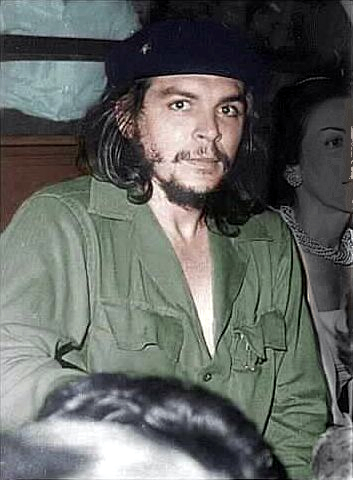
- Che Guevara, whose real name was Ernesto.
- Pronunciation: Spanish: [eɾˈnesto]
- Gender: Male

Other names
- Related names: Ernest, Ernst

Ernesto, a form of the name Ernest, is a masculine given name in several Romance languages. Notable people and characters with the name include:

== People ==
- Ernesto (footballer) (born 1979), Ernesto da Conceição Soares, Cape Verdean footballer
- Ernesto Abella, Filipino businessman, politician, and writer
- Ernesto Agard (born 1937), Panamanian basketball player
- Ernesto Aguero (born 1969), Cuban weightlifter
- Ernesto Alonso (1917–2007), Mexican actor, director, cinematographer, and producer
- Ernesto Amantegui Phumipha (born 1990), Thai footballer
- Ernesto Basile (1857–1932), Italian architect
- Ernesto Capocci (1798–1864), Italian mathematician, astronomer and politician
- Ernesto Cesàro (1859–1906), Italian mathematician
- Ernesto De Curtis (1875–1937), Italian composer
- Ernesto Farías (born 1980), Argentine footballer
- Ernesto Figueiredo (born 1937), also known as "Ernesto", Portuguese footballer
- Ernesto García (1884–1955), Mexican soldier and politician
- Ernesto Guevara de la Serna (1928–1967), also known as "El Che" or "Che Guevara"
- Ernesto Geisel (1908–1996), Brazilian president
- Ernesto Hein (1899–1968), Chilean farmer and liberal politician
- Ernesto Köhler (1849–1907), Italian flautist and composer
- Ernesto Lecuona (1895–1963), Cuban musician
- Ernesto Martínez Jr. (born 1999), French-Cuban baseball player
- Ernesto Mejía (disambiguation), several people
- Ernesto Maserati (1898–1975), Italian automotive engineer and racer
- Ernesto Michel (born 1970), Argentine basketball player
- Ernesto Miranda (1941–1976), American criminal
- Ernesto Nathan (1848–1921), English-Italian politician
- Ernesto Neyra (born 1952), Peruvian football manager and former player
- Ernesto Oglivie (born 1992), Panamanian basketball player
- Ernesto Pérez d'Angelo (1932–2013), Chilean paleontologist
- Ernesto Pinto Lagarrigue (1918–1977), Chilean engineer and politician
- Ernesto Purnsley, American football coach
- Ernesto Samper (born 1950), President of Colombia from 1994 to 1998
- Ernesto Ruffo Appel (born 1952), American-born Mexican politician
- Ernesto Rodríguez (born 1969), Argentine-Spanish volleyball player
- Ernesto Sabato (1911–2011), Argentine writer
- Ernesto Tagliaferri (1889–1937), Italian musician and composer
- Ernesto Valverde (born 1964), Spanish footballer and coach
- Ernesto Zedillo Ponce de León (born 1951), President of Mexico from 1994 to 2000

== Fictional characters ==
- Ernesto (Better Call Saul), a fictional character in the TV series Better Call Saul
- Ernesto de la Cruz, the main antagonist of Coco

== See also ==
- Ernesto (novel) (1953), an unfinished autobiographical novel by Umberto Saba, published posthumously in 1975
  - Ernesto (film), a 1979 Italian drama loosely based on the novel
- Hurricane Ernesto (disambiguation), several hurricanes
