= Hurricane Ernesto (2012) =

Category 2 Atlantic hurricane in 2012

- Ernesto intensifying and approaching the Yucatán Peninsula on August 7

Meteorological history
- Formed: August 1, 2012
- Dissipated: August 10, 2012

Category 2 hurricane
- 1-minute sustained (SSHWS/NWS)
- Highest winds: 100 mph (155 km/h)
- Lowest pressure: 973 mbar (hPa); 28.73 inHg

Overall effects
- Fatalities: 12
- Damage: $252 million (2012 USD)
- Areas affected: Windward Islands, Jamaica, Central America, Mexico
- IBTrACS
- Part of the 2012 Atlantic hurricane season

Hurricane Ernesto was a Category 2 hurricane and a damaging tropical cyclone that affected several Caribbean Islands and areas of Central America during August 2012. The fifth named storm and second hurricane of the 2012 Atlantic hurricane season, Ernesto originated from a tropical wave that emerged off the west coast of Africa in late July. Moving westward, the system developed into a tropical depression in the central Atlantic, and further into a tropical storm prior to entering the Caribbean Sea. The system encountered high wind shear south of Jamaica but subsequently reached its peak intensity as a Category 2 hurricane as it made landfall on the Yucatán Peninsula. Ernesto briefly emerged in the Bay of Campeche as a strong tropical storm before dissipating over the mountainous terrain of Mexico. The remnant circulation emerged in the eastern Pacific basin, contributing to the formation of Tropical Storm Hector.

Following the formation of the system, tropical storm watches and warnings were issued for the Windward Islands. Hurricane watches and warnings were extended for nearby Caribbean Islands in the days following as Ernesto trekked across the central Caribbean Sea. Evacuations were performed in low-lying areas on the Yucatán Peninsula and cruise ship departures were cancelled.

== Meteorological history ==
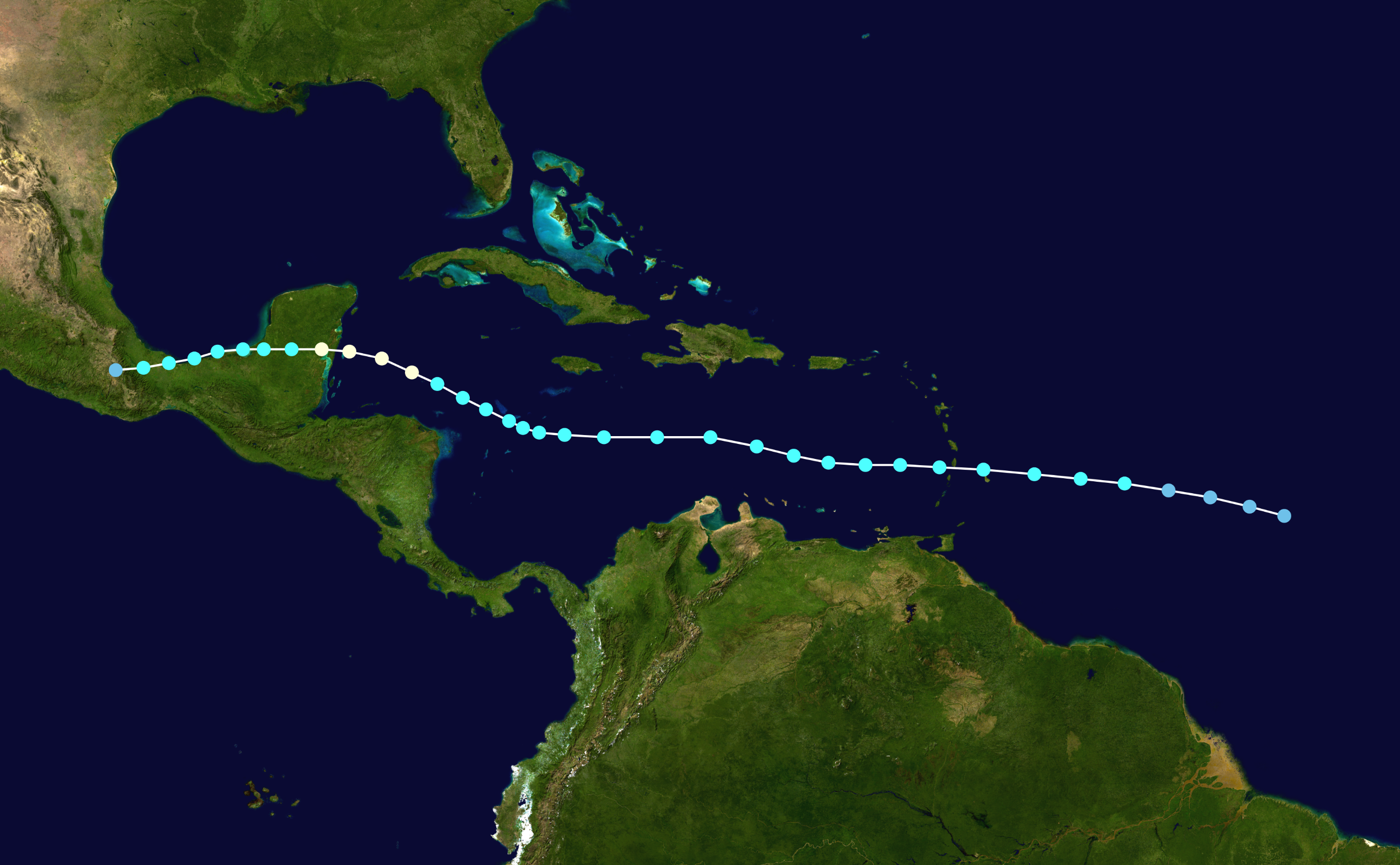
Map plotting the storm's track and intensity, according to the Saffir–Simpson scale Map key Saffir–Simpson scale Tropical depression (≤38 mph, ≤62 km/h) Tropical storm (39–73 mph, 63–118 km/h) Category 1 (74–95 mph, 119–153 km/h) Category 2 (96–110 mph, 154–177 km/h) Category 3 (111–129 mph, 178–208 km/h) Category 4 (130–156 mph, 209–251 km/h) Category 5 (≥157 mph, ≥252 km/h) Unknown Storm type Tropical cyclone Subtropical cyclone Extratropical cyclone, remnant low, tropical disturbance, or monsoon depression

On July 27, the precursor to Ernesto moved off the west coast of Africa as a tropical wave. At the time, the wave was associated with a disorganized area of convection. On July 29, a broad low pressure area developed in association with the tropical wave. The National Hurricane Center (NHC) first monitored the tropical wave in its tropical weather outlook on July 30, noting that the system had an accompanying low pressure area and was showing signs of development. The convection slowly organized due to generally favorable environmental conditions. After the circulation became better defined, the NHC initiated advisories on Tropical Depression Five at 2100 UTC on August 1. At the time, the depression was located about 810 mi (1305 km) east of the Lesser Antilles, moving west-northwestward due to an anticyclone to its north. In the 12 hours after its formation, the system's convection became disorganized due to westerly wind shear and dry air, and the NHC remarked the potential for degeneration into a tropical wave. However, the depression's rainbands began to strengthen and become more organized. A Hurricane Hunters flight on August 2 observed tropical storm force winds, and accordingly the NHC upgraded the depression to Tropical Storm Ernesto at 2100 UTC.

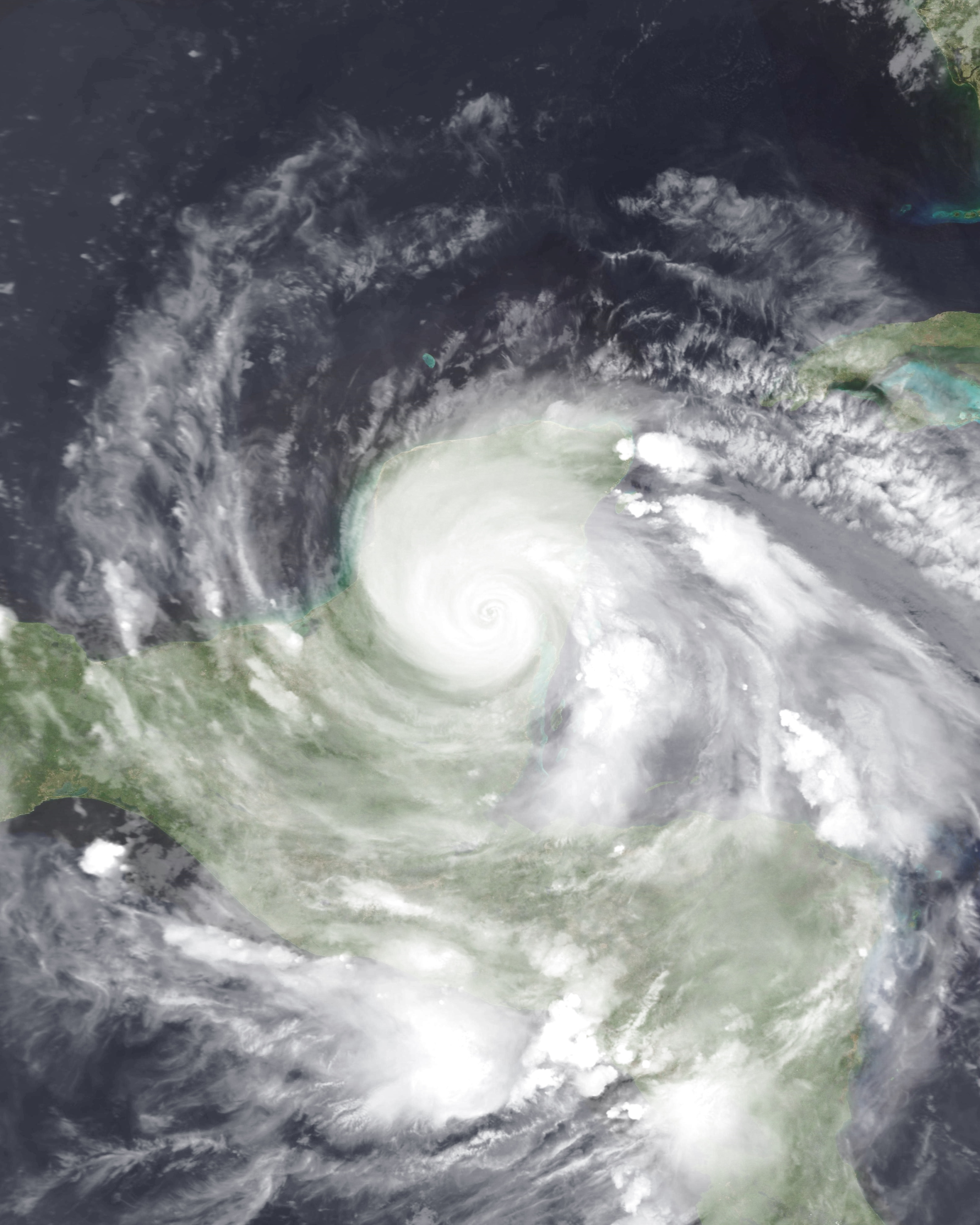
Hurricane Ernesto over the Yucatán Peninsula on August 8

After becoming a tropical storm, Ernesto initially had difficulty maintaining convection near the center, and its rapid westward movement prevented significant organization. At around 1200 UTC on August 3, the storm moved over or very near Saint Lucia, and radar imagery observed a well-defined circulation moving by the island. Wind shear gradually decreased over the storm, allowing for outflow to increase in its western portion. There were disparities among tropical cyclone forecast models over the future of Ernesto; some anticipated significant intensification due to warm waters and low shear, whereas others forecast the storm to remain a minimal storm or even weaken. Although the satellite appearance was well-organized, a Hurricane Hunters flight on August 4 observed a disorganized structure, and early the next day the circulation became exposed to the northwest of the convection; the weakening was possibly due to dry air and some mid-level shear, despite otherwise favorable conditions. On August 5, the storm passed south of Jamaica. It stayed on its current trajectory due to powerful ridging over the Southern United States. Early on August 6, convection redeveloped over the center after Ernesto slowed its westward movement, and decreasing wind shear allowed for restrengthening. Late on August 7, Ernesto intensified into a hurricane to the north of Honduras.

While approaching the Yucatán Peninsula, Ernesto quickly intensified, developing a well-defined eye. Early on August 8, the hurricane moved over Banco Chinchorro offshore extreme eastern Mexico as a strong Category 1 storm, then strengthened further into a Category 2 hurricane before making its mainland landfall on Mahahual, Quintana Roo, at around 10:15 p.m. CDT (0315 UTC), with winds of 100 mph (160 km/h). Operationally, the hurricane was held at a high-end Category 1 at its peak intensity. (Note: The position of Ernesto's Category 2 peak is not depicted in this graphic as it held as a strong Category 1 hurricane operationally, but after reassessment, it was deemed a Category 2.) Ernesto later weakened to tropical storm status after its convection weakened over land. It reemerged over the Bay of Campeche, and intensified into a strong tropical storm. The system moved inland across the Isthmus of Tehuantepec on the afternoon of August 9, and into southern Mexico before transitioning into a post-tropical cyclone on August 10. The remnants later contributed to the development of Tropical Storm Hector in the Eastern Pacific on August 11.

== Preparations and impact ==
=== Caribbean ===
When Ernesto first formed, a tropical storm watch was issued for Barbados, Saint Vincent and the Grenadines, Dominica, Saint Lucia, Martinique, and Guadeloupe at 2100 UTC on August 1. All of the watches were upgraded to a warning about 24 hours later, at which time Ernesto was upgraded to a tropical storm. At 0300 UTC on August 3, a tropical storm watch was issued for Grenada. After about six hours, the tropical storm warning was discontinued for Barbados and Saint Vincent and the Grenadines. The tropical storm watch for Grenada was canceled at 1200 UTC on August 3. The remaining tropical storm warnings were lifted three hours later.

While moving through the Lesser Antilles, Ernesto produced wind gusts of 63 mph (101 km/h) on Saint Lucia and sustained winds of 43 mph (69 km/h) in Barbados. Due to the storm, the airport in Dominica closed for two days, and ferry service between Guadeloupe, Dominica, Martinique, and Saint Lucia was canceled. On Saint Lucia, officials ordered businesses to close early. Although Ernesto passed very close to the island, the storm's quick movement allowed it to drop less than 1 in (25 mm) of rain. No damage was reported in the Lesser Antilles.

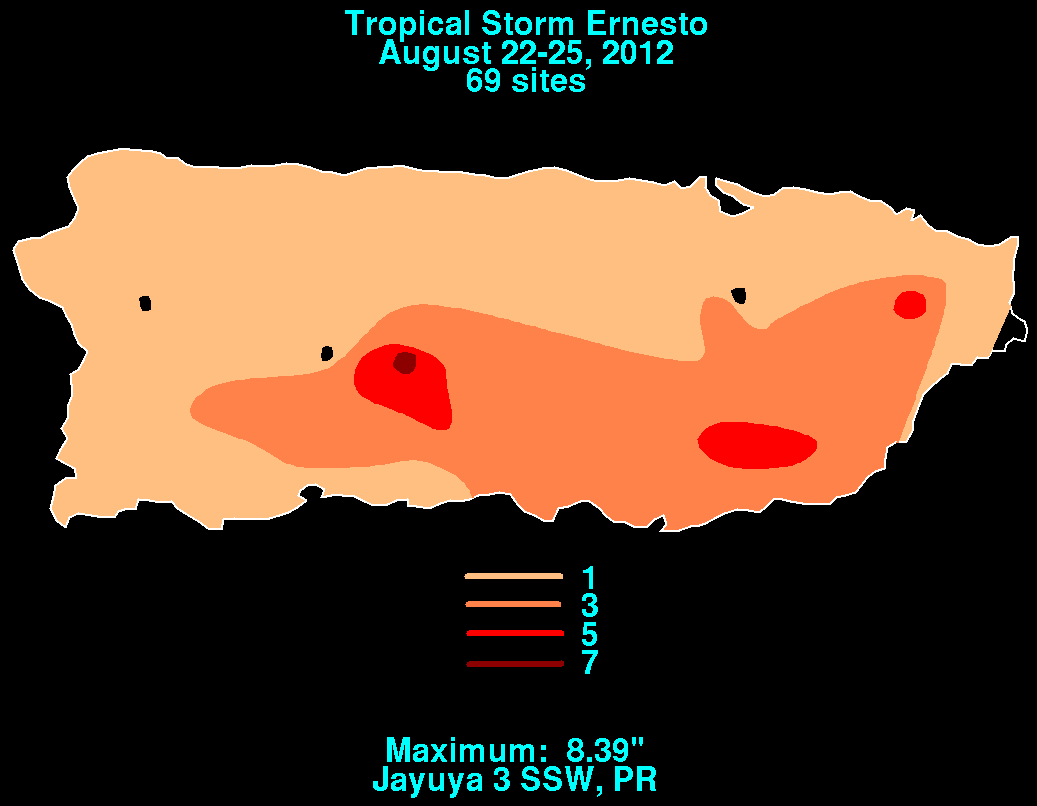
Rainfall totals from Hurricane Ernesto in Puerto Rico

In Puerto Rico, some areas experienced locally heavy rainfall, especially the southern half of the island. The heaviest amount of precipitation observed was 8.39 in (213 mm) near Jayuya. A few mudslides occurred and some streets flooded, leaving at least three cars stranded.

At 1200 UTC on August 4, the government of Jamaica issued an island-wide tropical storm watch, which was upgraded to a warning only three hours later. Officials ordered fishermen on outlying islands to evacuate to the mainland. A tropical storm watch was issued for the Cayman Islands at 1500 UTC on August 5, but it was discontinued about 24 hours later. Before Ernesto passed south of Jamaica, the government of Honduras issued a tropical storm watch from its border with Nicaragua to Punta Castilla at 0900 UTC on August 5. Twenty-four hours later, it was discontinued. However, a new tropical storm watch was issued from Punta Sal, located near Tela, to the Honduras–Guatemala border. Additionally, a tropical storm warning became in effect from Punta Sal to the border with Nicaragua, including the Bay Islands Department. These watches and warnings were discontinued at 2100 UTC on August 7. In Nicaragua, the civil defense authorities of the North Caribbean Coast Autonomous Region evacuated about 1,500 fishermen in the Miskito Cays, transporting them back to their respective communities.

In Guatemala, although tropical cyclone watches and warnings were not issued, a 72-hour yellow alert (moderate risk) was issued for the departments of Alta Verapaz, Izabal, Petén, and San Marcos on August 6. Rainfall generated by the storm in Petén Department caused minor flood damage to 14 homes in Ixobel, 6 residences in El Rastro, and 24 dwellings in Poptún. At El Milagro, 25 people were forced to flee their homes due to flooding, while 4 homes suffered minor impacts. Emergency resources collected prior to the storm were distributed by municipal authorities to the people affected.

The government of Belize issued a hurricane watch for its coastline at 1500 UTC on August 6, which was upgraded to a hurricane warning six hours later. At 2100 UTC on August 7, the portion of the hurricane warning from Belize City to the border with Guatemala was downgraded to a tropical storm warning. The remaining portion of the hurricane warning was downgraded to a tropical storm warning at 1200 UTC on August 8, the same time that the tropical storm warning from Belize City to the border with Guatemala was canceled. Three hours later, the tropical storm warning, which stretched from Belize City northward to the border with Mexico, was discontinued.

=== Mexico ===
Effects of Hurricane Ernesto in Cuenca del Papaloapan, Oaxaca

Losses by State
State	Fatalities	Damage		Source
State	Fatalities	MX$	US$	Source
Campeche	0	92.7 million	7.2 million	
Chiapas	0	664 million	51.9 million	
Guerrero	5	70 million	5.4 million	
Oaxaca	0	1.044 billion	81.6 million	
Tabasco	2	121.1 million	9.5 million	
Quintana Roo	0	163 million	12.7 million	
Veracruz	5	985.8 million	77 million	
Yucatán	0	88.3 million	6.9 million	
Total	12	3.9 billion	252.2 million	

On August 6, the Mexican government issued a hurricane and tropical storm watch for portions of the Yucatán Peninsula. After Ernesto began quickly intensifying, however, the Mexican government upgraded the watch to a hurricane warning from Chetumal to Punta Allen along the peninsula and a tropical storm warning northward to Tulum.

Authorities in the Mexican state of Quintana Roo were moving more than 1,300 tourists from resorts in Mahuahal and other spots to Chetumal, a bayside city that was expected to see less rain and wind than the coast. Two cruises ships scheduled to dock on the Riviera Maya put off their arrival. In the city of Tulum, some 6,000 tourists were sheltering in hotels that authorities said were strong enough to qualify as storm shelters. Authorities also prepared two kindergartens as shelters that can hold up to 220 people. Soldiers and police were moving 600 residents from the fishing village of Punta Allen in Quintana Roo and began preparing for the evacuation of residents from other low-lying coastal settlements. Mexico closed its three major oil export ports in the Gulf of Mexico - Coatzacoalcos, Cayos Arcas and Dos Bocas. Almost all of the country's crude oil exports are shipped to refineries on the Gulf Coast of the United States from the three ports. Authorities expected them to be back in operation by 9 August.

In Tabasco, heavy rains from the storm triggered flooding that killed two fishermen and damaged 100 homes. Three members of a family were killed when a tree fell on their pick-up truck of Río Blanco, Veracruz. Also in the state of Veracruz, a teenage girl died after her car got dragged in a current, and a 62-year-old man was killed by a lightning strike.

=== United States ===
In the United States, authorities in the Florida Panhandle and Alabama warned swimmers of potentially dangerous rip currents that will affect the coast for a few days. At least ten people were rescued in Pensacola Beach on 9 August alone. A man was injured in a lightning strike, and part of a store was washed away in Pensacola Beach on 10 August.

== See also ==
- Other storms with the same name
- Tropical Storm Chantal (2001) – took a similar track across the Caribbean before striking Belize
- Hurricane Earl (2016) - Similar storm that struck Belize as a category 1 hurricane in August 2016
