= Pedro Canché =

Mexican journalist

- Occupations: Journalist, activist

Pedro Canché is a Mexican journalist who spent nine months in prison in 2014–15 in Felipe Carrillo Puerto, a town in the southeastern state of Quintana Roo, for criticizing the state’s governor.

== Career ==
Canché was born on May 18, 1970. He grew up in the town of Boca Paila, where he taught himself to read and became interested in photography. At age nineteen he was working as a hot-dog vendor. He began to write articles and take pictures that he sent to the newspaper Novedades in Cancún. Among the subjects he covered were littering, potholes, and police taking bribes. When the newspaper began paying him for his contributions, he became a full-time journalist.

He works as a journalist in the city of Felipe Carrillo Puerto in the Mexican state of Quintana Roo.

== Arrest and detention ==
Canché was arrested in Felipe Carrillo Puerto on August 30, 2014, for allegedly sabotaging the local water supply. A few days prior to his arrest, he had published photos of local protests against increases in water tariffs and a video in which he criticized Quintana Roo’s governor, Roberto Borge. From the time of his arrest, a free-speech NGO called Article 19 began defending Canché. The group also accused Borge of ordering acts of harassment and aggression against Canché and his family.

He later said that a few days before his arrest, he had been warned by a journalist friend to “take refuge in some embassy” because “Borge is against you.”

On February 24, 2015, a Quintana Roo district judge ruled that the proceedings brought against him were arbitrary and that he had been denied due process. He was not released, however. In March 2015, Reporters Without Borders (RSF) expressed concern over the continued detention of Canché. His lawyer, María Araceli Andrade Tolama, said that she had filed an appeal against his arbitrary detention on March 13, but the local authorities had been instructed “to keep Pedro in prison for as long as possible,” the judge's ruling notwithstanding. Claire San Filippo of RSF said, “What’s the point of getting a judge to recognize that proceedings violate the federal constitution’s guarantees if he does not protect the victim’s human rights?” San Filippo called “for the immediate withdrawal of all the charges against Canché on the grounds of the arbitrary nature of the proceedings against him” and called on Mexican authorities “to stop using the judicial system to criminalize critical journalists.”

The Mexican authorities, in what RSF described as a familiar move in such cases, denied that Canché was a journalist, even though he had been working in that field since the 1990s, as confirmed by Lydia Cacho, a famous investigative reporter. “He poses a danger to Governor Roberto Borge both as a journalist and as an indigenous Mayan activist,” Cacho said. According to witnesses, the head of the Quintana Roo branch of the governing Institutional Revolutionary Party (PRI) and the private secretary of the office for State Public Defence played a role in the irregular detention of Canché. According to Article 19, Canché underwent persecution in prison.

During his imprisonment, Article 19 published an online blog, “Diary of a prisoner of conscience” written by Canché. According to the blog, he was beaten brutally shortly after he was taken into custody.

On May 18, 2015, he celebrated his 45th birthday in prison. Four days later, a protest was held at the Monument to Free Expression in Cancún calling for the immediate release of Canché.

== Release ==
Canché was finally released from prison on May 29, 2015. He immediately began drawing up a legal complaint in which he planned to charge various officials, including the Prosecutor General of the Republic (PGR), Gaspar Armando García Torres; the assistant prosecutor for the Mayan region, Blanca Imelda Ávila Varguez; and the public minister, Tila Patricia Galera León, in accordance with recommendations made by the National Human Rights Commission (CNDH). He also planned a separate complaint against Borge and 16 other officials. He told an interviewer that he was dedicating his freedom “to the journalists killed in line of duty.” He also said, “Revenge is sweet, forgiveness has a thousand flavors, all delicious, but I prefer justice.” He maintained that his arrest was entirely political, and was motivated by Borge's intolerance of criticism made by Canché of various offenses the governor had committed against the Mayan people. Canché promised to take his complaint “as far as it goes.”

Canché said that he felt he had “aged 10 years while in prison,” where he had felt a need to be alert at all times in order to ensure that nothing would happen to him. He said that he planned to publish a newspaper in the Mayan regions where people lack Internet access.

== Personal life ==
He has two children, a boy and a girl, who live with their mother in Cancún.
