= Ernie Adams =

Ernie Adams may refer to:

- Ernie Adams (actor) (1885–1947), American film actor
- Ernie Adams (American football) (born 1953), American football coach and administrator
- Ernie Adams (footballer, born 1922) (1922–2009), English association footballer
- Ernie Adams (footballer, born 1948), English association footballer
- Ernie Adams (Australian footballer) (1878–1946), Australian rules footballer

== See also ==
- Ernest Adams (disambiguation)
