= Hurricane Ernesto (2024) =

Category 2 Atlantic hurricane

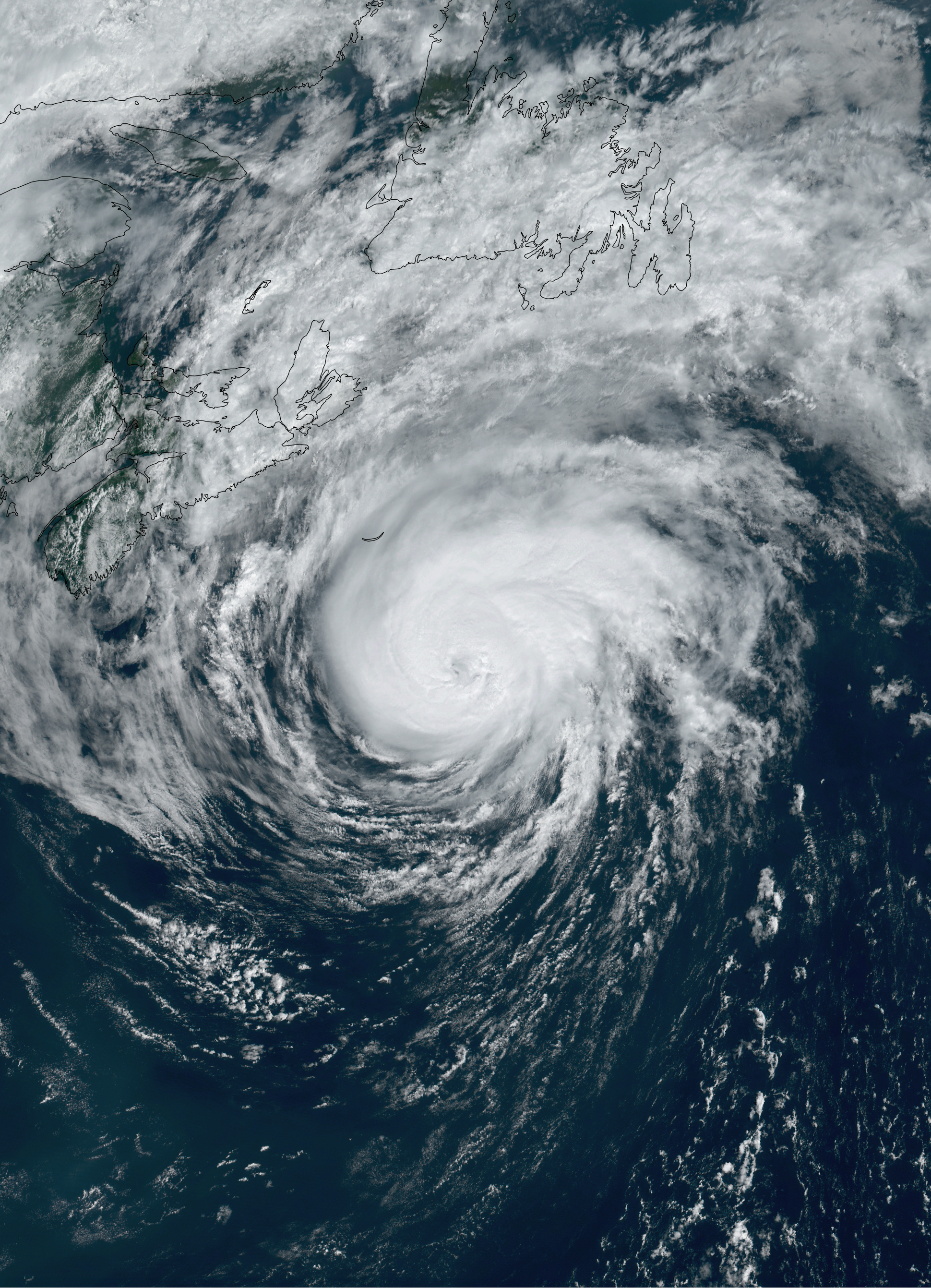
- Ernesto at peak intensity south of Nova Scotia on August 19

Meteorological history
- Formed: August 12, 2024
- Extratropical: August 20, 2024
- Dissipated: August 21, 2024

Category 2 hurricane
- 1-minute sustained (SSHWS/NWS)
- Highest winds: 100 mph (155 km/h)
- Lowest pressure: 967 mbar (hPa); 28.56 inHg

Overall effects
- Fatalities: 3
- Damage: $520 million (2024 USD)
- Areas affected: Leeward Islands; Puerto Rico; Bermuda; parts of Atlantic Canada
- IBTrACS
- Part of the 2024 Atlantic hurricane season

Hurricane Ernesto was a moderately strong Atlantic hurricane that caused significant flooding in Puerto Rico before striking Bermuda as a hurricane, becoming the second-wettest tropical cyclone in the territory on record. The fifth named storm and third hurricane of the 2024 Atlantic hurricane season, Ernesto developed from a tropical wave east of the Leeward Islands. The storm moved towards the Antilles, impacting several nations. Ernesto then turned north, where it reached Category 2 strength, before making landfall in Bermuda as a Category 1 hurricane on August 17. Ernesto then weakened back to a tropical storm before intensifying back into a hurricane and brushing Atlantic Canada, becoming extratropical by August 20.

At least three deaths have been tied to Ernesto, all related to rip currents from the hurricane along the East Coast of the United States and $520 million in damages were done by Ernesto.

== Meteorological history ==
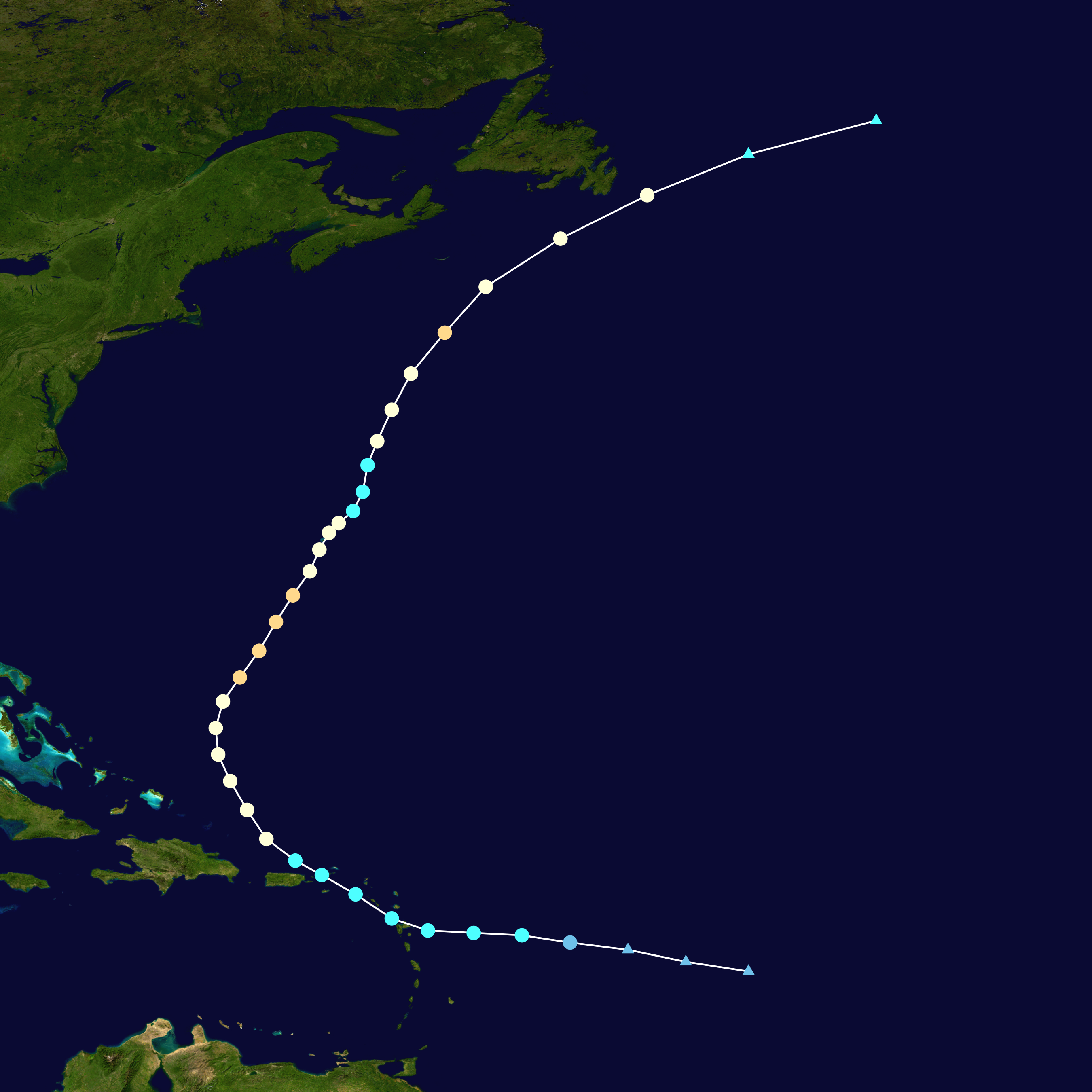
Map plotting the storm's track and intensity, according to the Saffir–Simpson scale Map key Saffir–Simpson scale Tropical depression (≤38 mph, ≤62 km/h) Tropical storm (39–73 mph, 63–118 km/h) Category 1 (74–95 mph, 119–153 km/h) Category 2 (96–110 mph, 154–177 km/h) Category 3 (111–129 mph, 178–208 km/h) Category 4 (130–156 mph, 209–251 km/h) Category 5 (≥157 mph, ≥252 km/h) Unknown Storm type Tropical cyclone Subtropical cyclone Extratropical cyclone, remnant low, tropical disturbance, or monsoon depression

Ernesto formed out of a tropical wave that moved off Africa on August 7, 2024. The wave slowly gelled over the next several days. On August 10, a broad low-pressure area formed in a large area of relatively robust thunderstorms and showers as it moved quickly westward. As the system was expected to impact the Leeward Islands in the Caribbean, it was designated Potential Tropical Cyclone Five soon after. The next day, convective activity became better defined, but scatterometer data did not yet confirm a closed circulation. However, intense storms developed near the center of the low-pressure area.

At 12:00 UTC on August 12, the system was upgraded to Tropical Depression Five about 450 mi (720 km) east of Guadeloupe in the Leeward Islands; it was named Ernesto six hours later. Then, Ernesto slowed down, pushed by a large subtropical ridge. Ernesto approached and made landfall in Guadeloupe as a 40 mph (65 km/h) strong tropical storm around 09:40 UTC on August 13. Later that day, Ernesto turned west-northwestward across the northeastern Caribbean. Environmental conditions promoted intensification, with low vertical wind shear, high sea surface temperatures, and ample mid-level moisture.

After crossing the Virgin Islands, Ernesto re-entered the Atlantic Ocean, passing about 45 mi (75 km) north of San Juan, Puerto Rico, as a 70 mph (110 km/h) tropical storm by 06:00 UTC on August 14. It continued intensifying and became a hurricane six hours later, while situated 115 mi (185 km) northeast of the easternmost Dominican Republic. An eyewall formed later that day. Ernesto remained a minimal hurricane on August 15, struggling with dry air. Though the cyclone only slowly strengthened, its wind field and radius of maximum wind (RMW) grew due to a larger eyewall. As this occurred, Ernesto encountered a weakness in the ridge caused by a large mid-to upper-level trough moving off the eastern U.S. As a result, the cyclone began curving northwestward, northward, and then northeastward. Ernesto peaked as a 100 mph (155 km/h) Category 2 hurricane by 00:00 UTC on August 16, while sited several hundred miles south-southwest of Bermuda. Then, the hurricane's convective structure became asymmetric due to wind shear from the trough northwest of Ernesto. As Ernesto turned, it neared Bermuda.

Ernesto began to weaken as a trough induced westerly vertical wind shear, causing dry air to enter the hurricane. Early on August 17, it made landfall in Bermuda as an 100 mph (155 km/h) Category 1 hurricane, decelerating as the trough bypassed the storm to its north. Ernesto restrengthened to a hurricane at 18:00 UTC on August 18. The hurricane deepened further as it passed over the warm Gulf Stream, attaining a short secondary peak of 100 mph (155 km/h) at 12:00 UTC on August 19, while located about 520 mi (835 km) southwest of Cape Race, Newfoundland. Afterwards, it accelerated northeastward, rounding the northern flank of a resurgent subtropical ridge to its southeast. Ernesto began weakening due to cooler sea surface temperatures, making its closest approach to Newfoundland's Avalon Peninsula while undergoing extratropical transition. It ended this process by 12:00 UTC on August 20, while positioned 260 mi (415 km) east-northeast of St. John's, Newfoundland and Labrador. It continued accelerating east-northeastward, opening into a trough 12 hours later. The open trough hit Great Britain and Ireland on August 22.

== Preparations ==
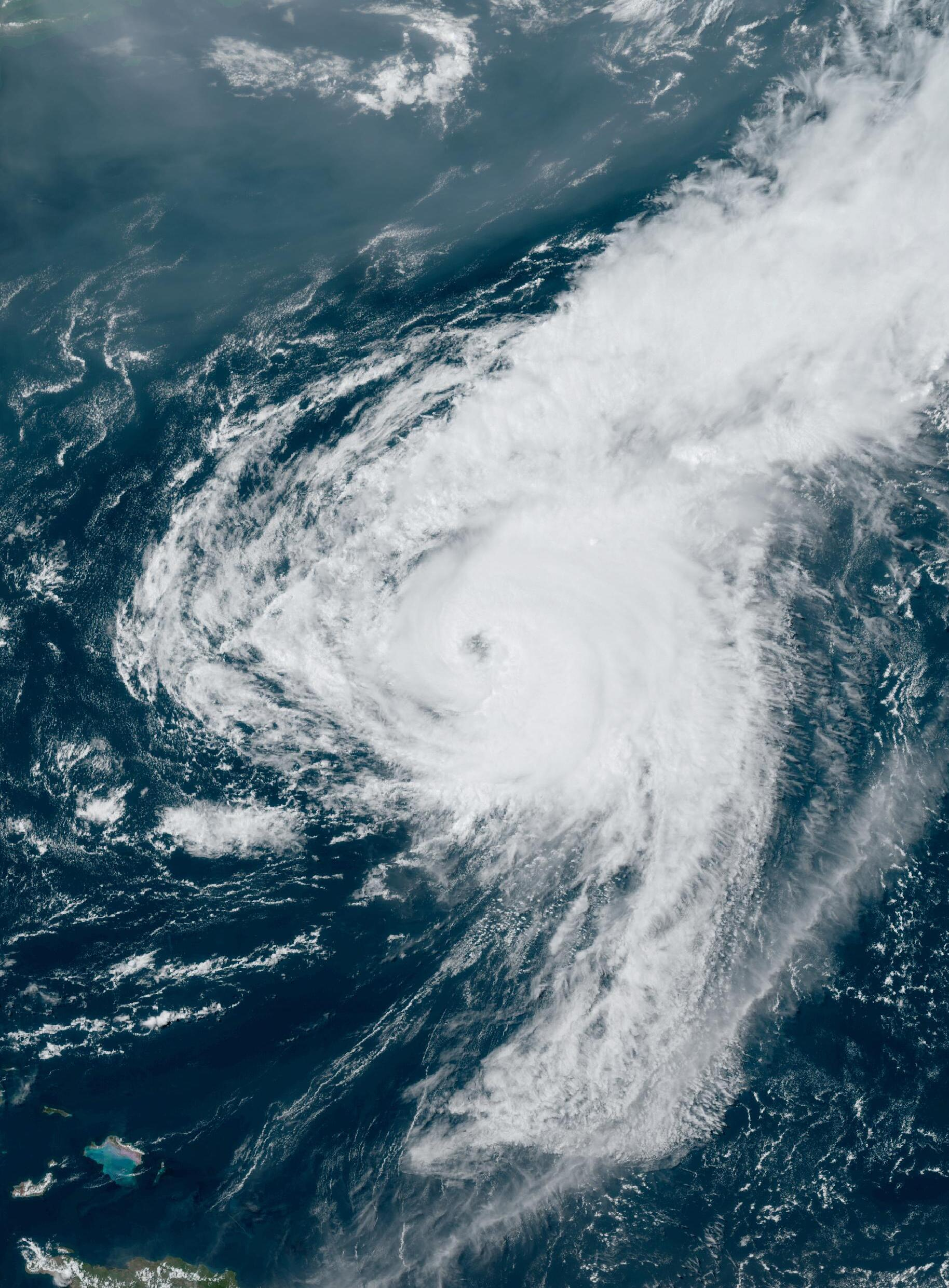
Hurricane Ernesto at its initial peak intensity while approaching Bermuda on August 16

Tropical storm warnings were issued in advance of Ernesto for Anguilla, Antigua and Barbuda, the British Virgin Islands, the French West Indies (apart from Martinique), Montserrat, Puerto Rico, Saint Kitts and Nevis, Sint Maarten, and the United States Virgin Islands. A hurricane watch was issued for the British and US Virgin Islands, and a hurricane warning was issued for Bermuda.

=== Leeward Islands ===
Orange alerts were issued for the French territories of Saint Martin and Saint Barthelemy. The offices of France Travail closed on August 13 with remaining teams mobilized via telephone. In Sint Maarten, the Dutch portion of Saint Martin, Princess Juliana International Airport closed on August 13 and reopened the following day. Schools in the territory were closed. Prime Minister Luc Mercelina ordered political parties and businesses to remove billboards and other apparatus from public roads. The VC Bird International Airport in Antigua closed on the night of August 12 and reopened the following afternoon.

=== Puerto Rico ===
The Puerto Rico National Guard was mobilized ahead of the arrival of the storm. The government also delayed the start of classes for public schools and froze prices for essential goods, while municipal mayors activated emergency plans. LUMA Energy said that there were over 1,000 workers and more than $200 million worth of supplies ready to respond to power outages due to the storm, as well as independent contractors. The National Guard also transferred the only remaining native parrots on the island, the Puerto Rican amazon, indoors. More than 140 flights were cancelled in Puerto Rico.

=== Bermuda ===
Bermuda was placed under a hurricane warning. The L.F. Wade International Airport was closed, while public transportation was temporarily halted.

=== Elsewhere ===
Dangerous rip currents were warned for in the Bahamas, Turks and Caicos Islands, and the Dominican Republic.

Rip current warnings statements and small craft advisories were issued along the coast of Florida from West Palm Beach up to Jacksonville and also along the coast of Georgia. In New York City, parks and the beaches of Brooklyn and Queens were shut down.

Areas of Scotland were placed under a yellow warning by the Met Office as the remnants of Ernesto were forecast to approach. Met Éireann also issued yellow warnings for Galway and Mayo. The Strathaven Balloon Race was cancelled in anticipation of gusty winds from the system. Sandbags were distributed and placed across west Ireland. Galway County Council shut down roads and parking that were vulnerable to flooding.

== Impact ==
Three deaths and $520 million in damages have been attributed to Ernesto.

=== Leeward Islands ===
A gust of 77 miles per hour (124 km/h) was recorded in Saint Barthélemy and 61 miles per hour (98 km/h) in Saint Martin. In Sint Maarten, minor damage was reported. Localized flooding occurred, while some bits of debris were thrown around. As Ernesto passed south of Anguilla, it brought strong winds and hazardous surf conditions to the island. The Blowing Hole and Sandy Ground ports were closed in preparation for the storm, and Clayton J. Lloyd International Airport closed early until further notice. On the island of Sint Eustatius, many trees were downed. Almost every village on the island had some damage. Multiple roadways were damaged and flooded. One road needed to be stabilized by a backhoe. Power outages occurred but was quickly restored. Part of a historic stone structure was knocked into a wall that resided below.

In Saint Kitts and Nevis, powerlines and trees were downed, while workers needed to clear roads of debris after Ernesto passed by. The National Emergency Management Agency of St. Kitts advised residents to stay off roads and potentially unstable ground. Preliminary damage due to Ernesto across the island was estimated at EC$2.1 million (US$780,000). Power outages occurred in Antigua and Barbuda. In Montserrat, heavy rainfall and winds from Ernesto damaged a ship in Little Bay. The boat was carrying roughly 250 litres (66 US gal) of diesel oil, though the Oil Spill Team was able to recover the diesel oil.

Several main roads on the island of Guadeloupe were closed due to the storm. More than 45,000 customers lost power in the Virgin Islands as a result of hurricane force wind gusts. The entirety of Saint Croix and Saint Thomas lost electricity. By August 14, many roads in the US Virgin Islands were still damaged and residents were urged to stay off of them. Many trees and utility poles were knocked down by winds across the islands, while branches from the trees were scattered across the roadways. At least six cellphone towers were disabled in the Virgin Islands. United States President Joe Biden approved a disaster declaration for the US Virgin Islands.

Power outages occurred on all islands. All schools were closed prior to the storm's arrival. Over 10,000 people were still without power in the US Virgin Islands on August 16.

=== Puerto Rico ===
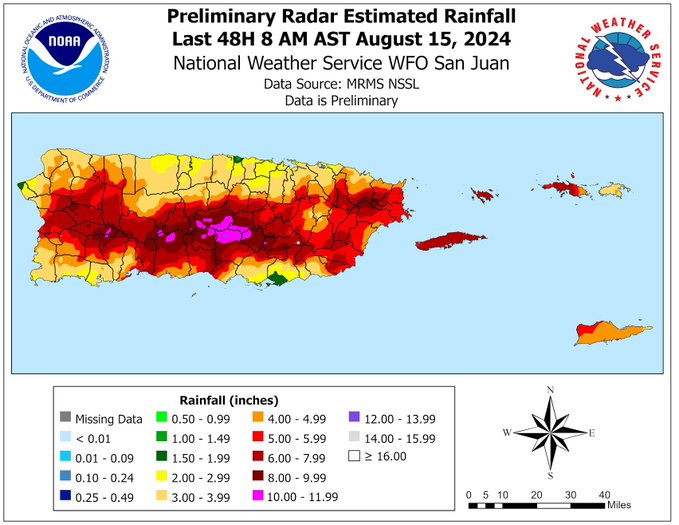
Preliminary rainfall totals in Puerto Rico from Tropical Storm Ernesto during August 14–15

Sustained winds on the island of Culebra reached 86 mph (138 km/h), where downed trees blocked roads and roofs were blown off. Over 728,000 households in Puerto Rico lost power, around half of the island. An additional 235,000 households suffered water outages. United States President Joe Biden approved a disaster declaration for Puerto Rico. Multiple rivers on the island overflowed, damaging roads and causing flooding. By morning on August 16, over 200,000 Puerto Ricans were still without power. According to the Puerto Rico Department of Agriculture, damage to crops on the island totaled $23.5 million (2024 USD), including $11.5 million in damage to bananas, $2.5 million to coffee and vegetables, $2 million to guineos, and $800,000 to citrus and fruits. In addition, $1 million worth of damage was dealt to hydroponics, $1.2 million to fodder, and $2 million to roads. Crews worked to restore power in Puerto Rico.

=== Bermuda ===
Wettest tropical cyclones and their remnants in Bermuda Highest-known totals
Precipitation			Storm	Location	Ref.
Rank	mm	in	Storm	Location	Ref.
1	186.7	7.35	October 1939 Hurricane		
2	177	7.0	Ernesto 2024		
3	172.0	6.77	Nicole 2016		
4	153.7	6.05	Arlene 1963		
5	151.4	5.96	Cristobal 2002		
6	148.0	5.83	Nicole 2004		
7	134.1	5.28	T.D. #23A 1967		
8	126.2	4.97	Franklin 2005		
9	125.0	4.92	Emily 1981		
10	124.0	4.88	Harvey 2005		

Ernesto made landfall on Bermuda, becoming the first hurricane to do so since Paulette of 2020. A storm surge of 2.27 ft (0.69 m), along with wind gusts to 110 mph (175 km/h). Rainfall totaled 6.98 in (177 mm) at L.F. Wade International Airport, resulting in urban flooding that covered some roadways with scattered debris. Hurricane-force gusts swept across the island, toppling utility poles, downing trees or snapping off their branches, and causing light wind damage to a few businesses. Ernesto's winds kicked up large waves along Bermuda's coasts; some coastal hotels and business suffered mild flooding. BELCO reported that 51 main power lines were damaged, resulting in widespread outages. At the apex of the storm, 28,817 customers on the island lost power, which took several days to be restored in part due to utility pole fires. However, no major damage was reported in Bermuda.

=== Elsewhere ===
Swells generated by Ernesto effected the Turks and Caicos Islands, the Bahamas, and the Dominican Republic. Rip currents also impacts the Eastern Seaboard of the United States. In South Carolina, rip currents spawned by Ernesto resulted in the deaths of two people. In North Carolina, a home along the shoreline on Hatteras Island collapsed due to the waves generated by Ernesto, while many others were at risk. One death was reported in North Carolina, where a surfer was found dead in Surf City. Large waves and rip currents also stretched north in beaches in Virginia, Delaware, and Maryland. In New Jersey, a man was rescued by lifeguards after being pulled out by rip currents. He sustained knee and back injuries. In Ventnor City, eight rescues were made. Ernesto's outflow brought dry air to Florida, decreasing rain and heat indices. Overall, around ten thousand people were under coastal flood advisories.

In Galway, streets and quays along waterways were inundated. Flooding was exacerbated by a supermoon.

== See also ==
- Other storms of the same name
- Weather of 2024
- Tropical cyclones in 2024
- Timeline of the 2024 Atlantic hurricane season
- List of Category 2 Atlantic hurricanes
- List of Bermuda hurricanes
- Hurricane Earl (2022) – a storm of similar intensity that had a similar track to Ernesto
