= Ernest Walker =

Ernest or Ernie Walker may refer to:

- Ernest Walker (composer) (1870–1949), British composer
- Ernie Walker (baseball) (Ernest Robert Walker, 1890–1965), American Major League Baseball outfielder
- Ernie Walker (football) (Ernest John Munro Walker, 1928–2011), Scottish football administrator
- Ernie Walker (footballer) (Ernest Edwin D. Walker, 1889–1958), English footballer
- Jimmy Walker (country musician) (Ernest Earl Walker, 1915–1990), American country musician
