= Hurricane Ernesto (2006) =

Category 1 Atlantic hurricane in 2006

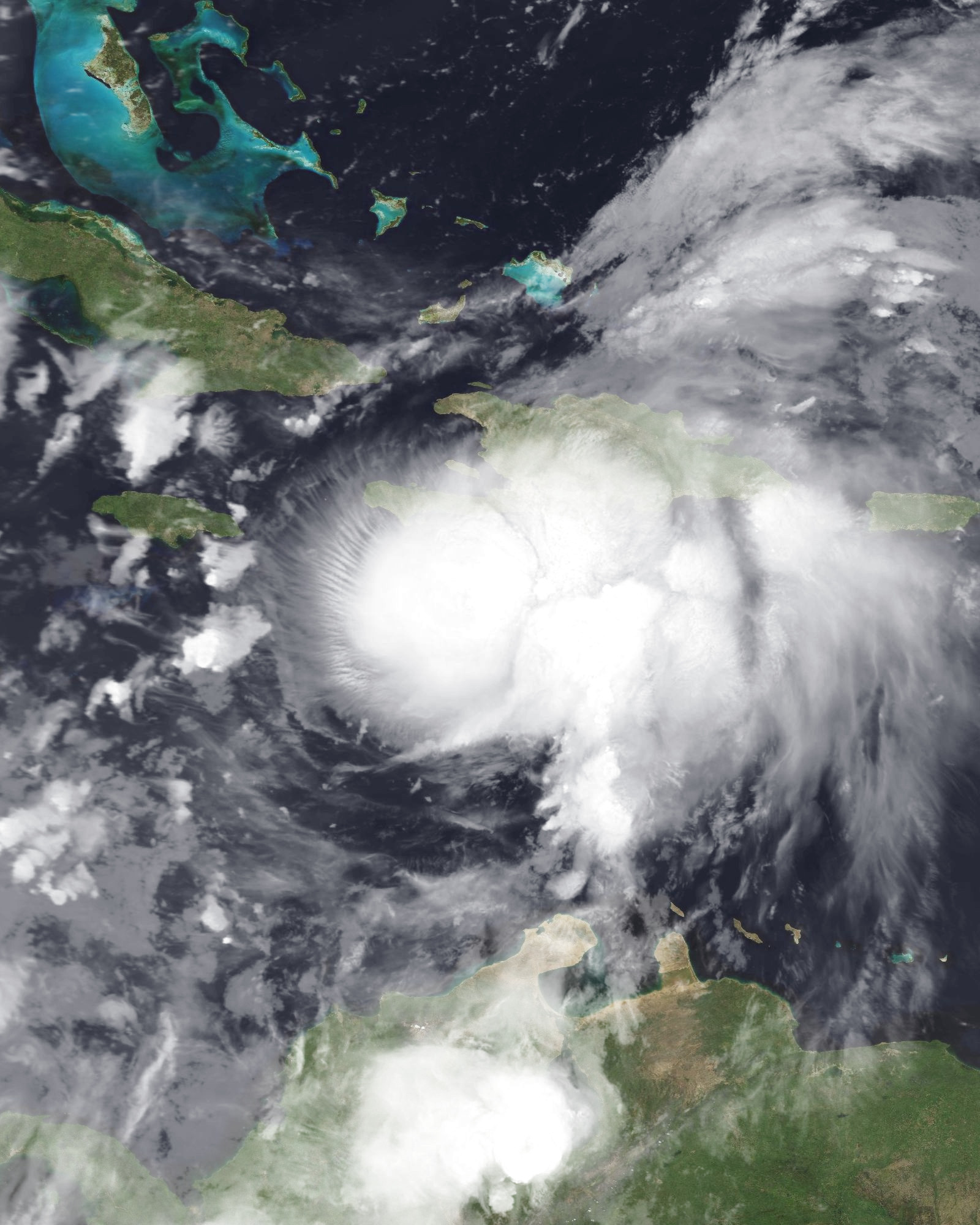
- Ernesto at peak intensity in the Caribbean Sea on August 27

Meteorological history
- Formed: August 24, 2006
- Dissipated: September 1, 2006

Category 1 hurricane
- 1-minute sustained (SSHWS/NWS)
- Highest winds: 75 mph (120 km/h)
- Lowest pressure: 985 mbar (hPa); 29.09 inHg

Overall effects
- Fatalities: 11
- Damage: $500 million (2006 USD)
- Areas affected: Lesser Antilles, Greater Antilles, East Coast of the United States, Atlantic Canada
- IBTrACS
- Part of the 2006 Atlantic hurricane season

Hurricane Ernesto was the costliest tropical cyclone of the 2006 Atlantic hurricane season. The sixth tropical storm and first hurricane of the season, Ernesto developed from a tropical wave on August 24 in the eastern Caribbean Sea. Ernesto first affected the northern Caribbean, reaching minimal hurricane status near Haiti before weakening and moving across eastern Cuba as a tropical storm. Despite initial predictions for it to track through the eastern Gulf of Mexico as a major hurricane, Ernesto moved across eastern Florida as a weak tropical storm. After turning to the northeast, it re-intensified and made landfall on August 31 on the North Carolina coast just below hurricane status. Late the next day, Ernesto became extratropical after entering southern Virginia. The remnants spread moisture across the northeastern United States before dissipating over eastern Canada on September 4.

The deaths of at least eleven people were attributed to Ernesto, which dumped heavy rains throughout its path, especially in the Mid-Atlantic region of the United States. While moving across the Caribbean, it affected several countries, and initially Ernesto posed a threat to the Gulf Coast of the United States around the one-year anniversary of Hurricane Katrina. Damage in Virginia was estimated at over $118 million (2006 USD), prompting the declaration of a federal disaster area. Total damage in the United States was estimated at $500 million (2006 USD).

== Meteorological history ==
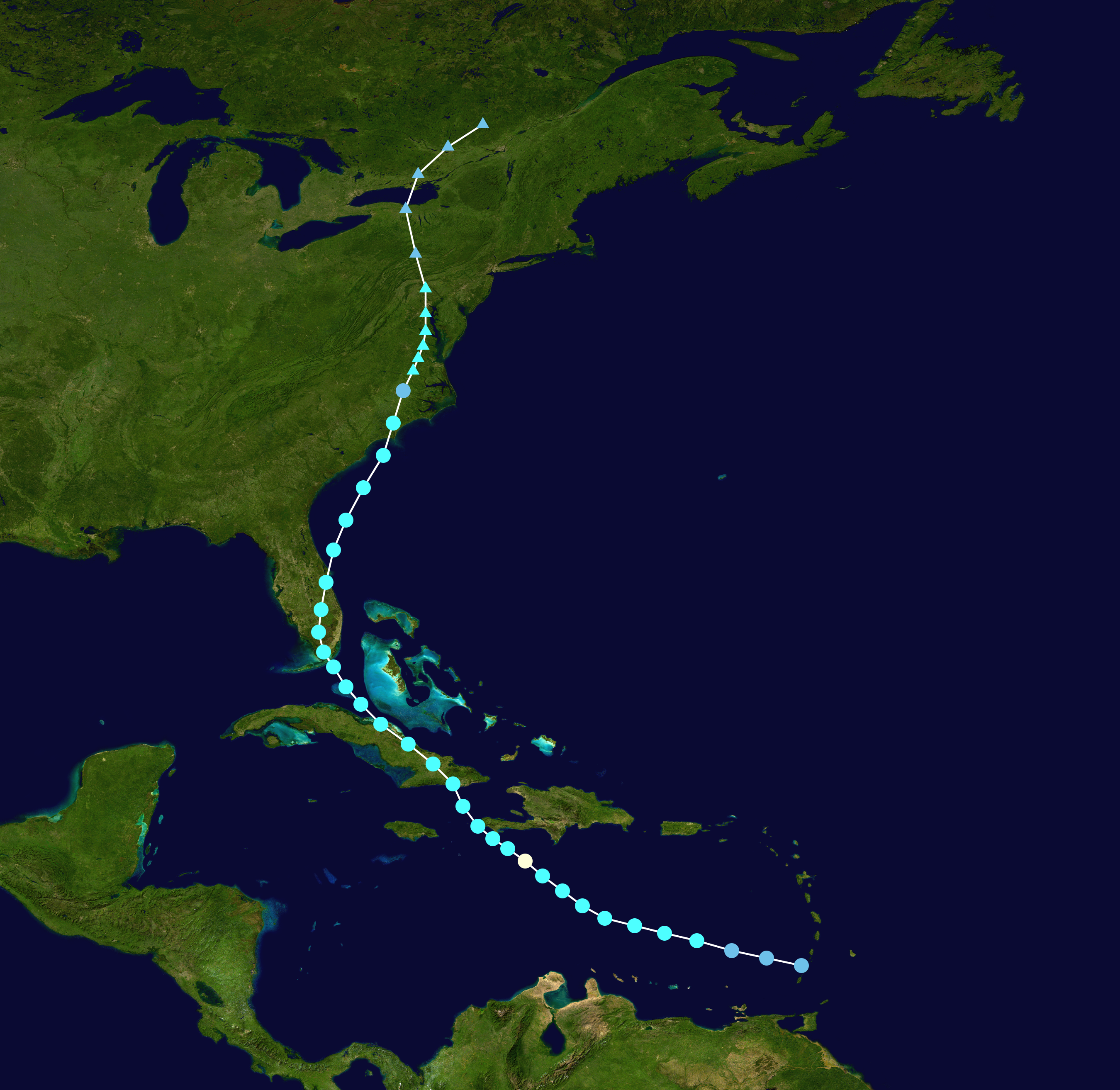
Map plotting the storm's track and intensity, according to the Saffir–Simpson scale Map key Saffir–Simpson scale Tropical depression (≤38 mph, ≤62 km/h) Tropical storm (39–73 mph, 63–118 km/h) Category 1 (74–95 mph, 119–153 km/h) Category 2 (96–110 mph, 154–177 km/h) Category 3 (111–129 mph, 178–208 km/h) Category 4 (130–156 mph, 209–251 km/h) Category 5 (≥157 mph, ≥252 km/h) Unknown Storm type Tropical cyclone Subtropical cyclone Extratropical cyclone, remnant low, tropical disturbance, or monsoon depression

On August 18, a tropical wave moved off the coast of Africa. It tracked westward, and its convection began organizing and concentrating on August 22. The next day, convection increased along the wave axis, and Dvorak classifications from the Tropical Analysis and Forecast Branch of the National Hurricane Center began at 1200 UTC on August 23. As it approached the Lesser Antilles, a surface low developed, and with the confirmation of a closed low-level circulation from the Hurricane Hunters, it is estimated the system developed into Tropical Depression Five on August 24 about 50 mi (80 km) north-northwest of Grenada.

Located to the south of a ridge across the southwestern Atlantic Ocean, the depression tracked west-northwestward through an area of dry air and westerly wind shear. Despite the shear, convection intensified near the center as banding features improved, and on August 24, the depression intensified into Tropical Storm Ernesto. Convection deepened and expanded, though wind shear displaced the low-level center to the west of the convection. By August 26, the structure had become much better-defined, and within five days Ernesto was forecast to be located about 275 mi (443 km) south of the Gulf Coast of the United States as a powerful hurricane. The center reformed under the deepest convection after wind shear decreased, and at the same time outflow increased in all quadrants. Turning northwestward, a small eye formed, and early on August 27 Ernesto attained hurricane status about 95 mi (200 km) south-southwest of the border between Haiti and the Dominican Republic.

Infra-red animation of Tropical Storm Ernesto making landfall in South Florida on August 29

Upon becoming a hurricane, Ernesto was believed to be undergoing rapid intensification. However, the small inner core deteriorated as the circulation interacted with the mountainous terrain of southwest Haiti, and it quickly weakened back to tropical storm status. The center became broad and ill-defined, though it was forecast to re-intensify to hurricane status before striking Cuba. It continued to weaken due to land interaction, and early on August 28 Ernesto passed just offshore of the southwestern tip of Haiti with winds of 45 mph (70 km/h). Hindered by increased wind shear from an upper-level low over the Bahamas, the storm weakened further before striking just west of Guantánamo Bay in Cuba as a minimal tropical storm. With very warm water temperatures and a favorable upper-level environment, one forecast remarked the possibility of Ernesto strengthening greatly over the Straits of Florida and eastern Gulf of Mexico to hit western Florida as a major hurricane. Ernesto remained over land as a minimal tropical storm for about 18 hours before reaching the Straits of Florida. Convection gradually increased over the warm waters, though Ernesto failed to strengthen significantly due to its disrupted inner core. An eastward-moving high pressure system over the southeastern United States allowed a continued northwest movement, and at 0300 UTC on August 30 the storm struck Plantation Key in the upper Florida Keys with winds of 45 mph (70 km/h). Two hours later, Ernesto made landfall on the Florida mainland in southwestern Miami-Dade County.

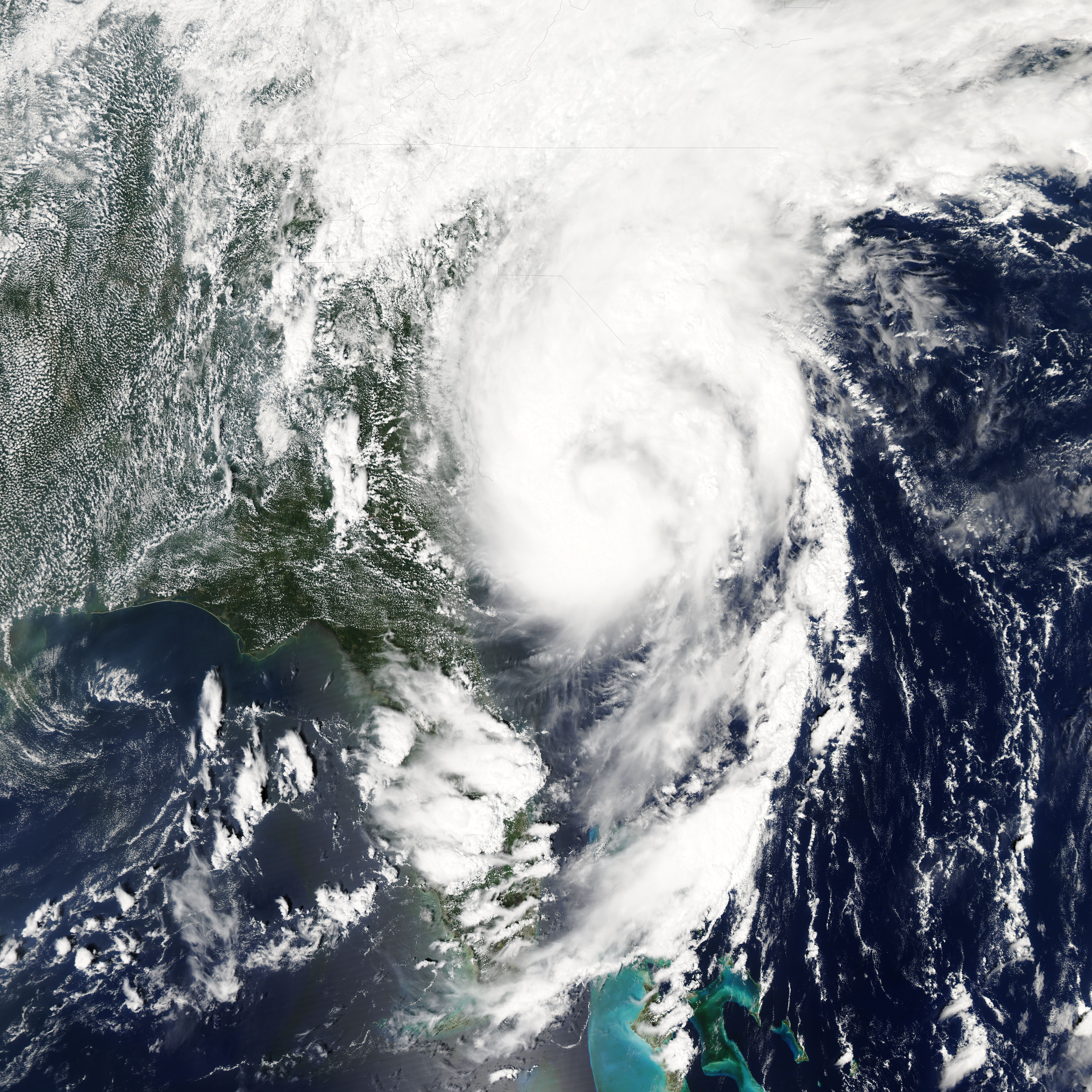
Tropical Storm Ernesto intensifying along the Atlantic coast on August 31

Moving through a weakness in the subtropical ridge, the storm turned to the north through the state. Operationally, the National Hurricane Center downgraded Ernesto to tropical depression status while over the state, though post-analysis indicated the system maintained tropical storm status. Ernesto retained a well-organized cloud pattern over land, and after emerging over the Atlantic Ocean near Cape Canaveral, convection again increased and began wrapping into the circulation. Upon reaching the Atlantic Ocean, Ernesto accelerated north-northeastward ahead of an approaching deep layer trough. The convection increased as the storm strengthened over warm waters, and late on August 31 Ernesto attained an intensity of 70 mph (110 km/h) while located about 170 mi (270 km) south-southwest of Wilmington, North Carolina. Shortly prior to moving ashore, an eye began to develop, and early on September 1 the storm made landfall on Oak Island, North Carolina very near the threshold between tropical storm and hurricane status. The National Hurricane Center remarked the possibility that Ernesto could have been a hurricane at landfall, due to the possibility that the strongest maximum wind was not sampled.

After landfall the storm rapidly weakened, and about eight hours after moving ashore, Ernesto deteriorated to tropical depression status. Interacting with a pre-existing frontal zone that extended eastward through Virginia, Ernesto quickly lost its tropical characteristics, and late on September 1 it transitioned into an extratropical cyclone. It re-intensified to a gale over the Mid-Atlantic states, only to weaken to an extratropical depression near Pennsylvania. With a large high pressure area to its east, the remnants turned to the north-northwest, reaching southern Ontario on September 3. After turning northeastward, the extratropical remnants of Ernesto were absorbed into a larger storm over Quebec on September 4.

== Preparations ==
=== Caribbean ===
About nine hours after Ernesto became a tropical storm, the government of Haiti issued a tropical storm watch from its border with the Dominican Republic to the southwestern tip of the country. As the storm strengthened, the watch was replaced with a tropical storm warning, and about 15 hours prior to its closest approach the warning was replaced with a hurricane warning. Several low-lying citizens in Gonaïves were evacuated after local meteorologists anticipated up to 20 inches (510 mm) of rain in some mountainous areas. Additionally, authorities advised residents in shanty towns near the ocean to evacuate to emergency shelters.

Jamaican officials issued radio and television advisories for residents in low-lying areas, urging them to be ready and evacuate if necessary. The Jamaican government opened all shelters on the island and placed its armed forces on standby. Long lines for storm supplies were reported at local businesses ahead of the storm as residents rushed to obtain supplies in preparation for Ernesto's onslaught. When a tropical storm warning was put in effect for Jamaica and the central Bahamas, cruise ship companies indicated they were diverting several liners to avoid the storm.

Hurricane warnings were put in effect for six provinces in southeastern Cuba, where significant precipitation ranging up to 20 inches (510 mm) across the mountainous south was expected as the center of Ernesto tracked slowly across Cuba. Cuban officials evacuated 300,000 people and brought its fishing fleet into harbors. The Cuban state television broadcast extensive warnings about the storm, urging precautions. Cattle were moved to higher ground, tourists were evacuated from hotels in the southeastern province of Granma, and baseball games scheduled for the evening of August 27 in Havana were played earlier in the day. The threat of the storm caused domestic flights to be canceled.

=== United States ===
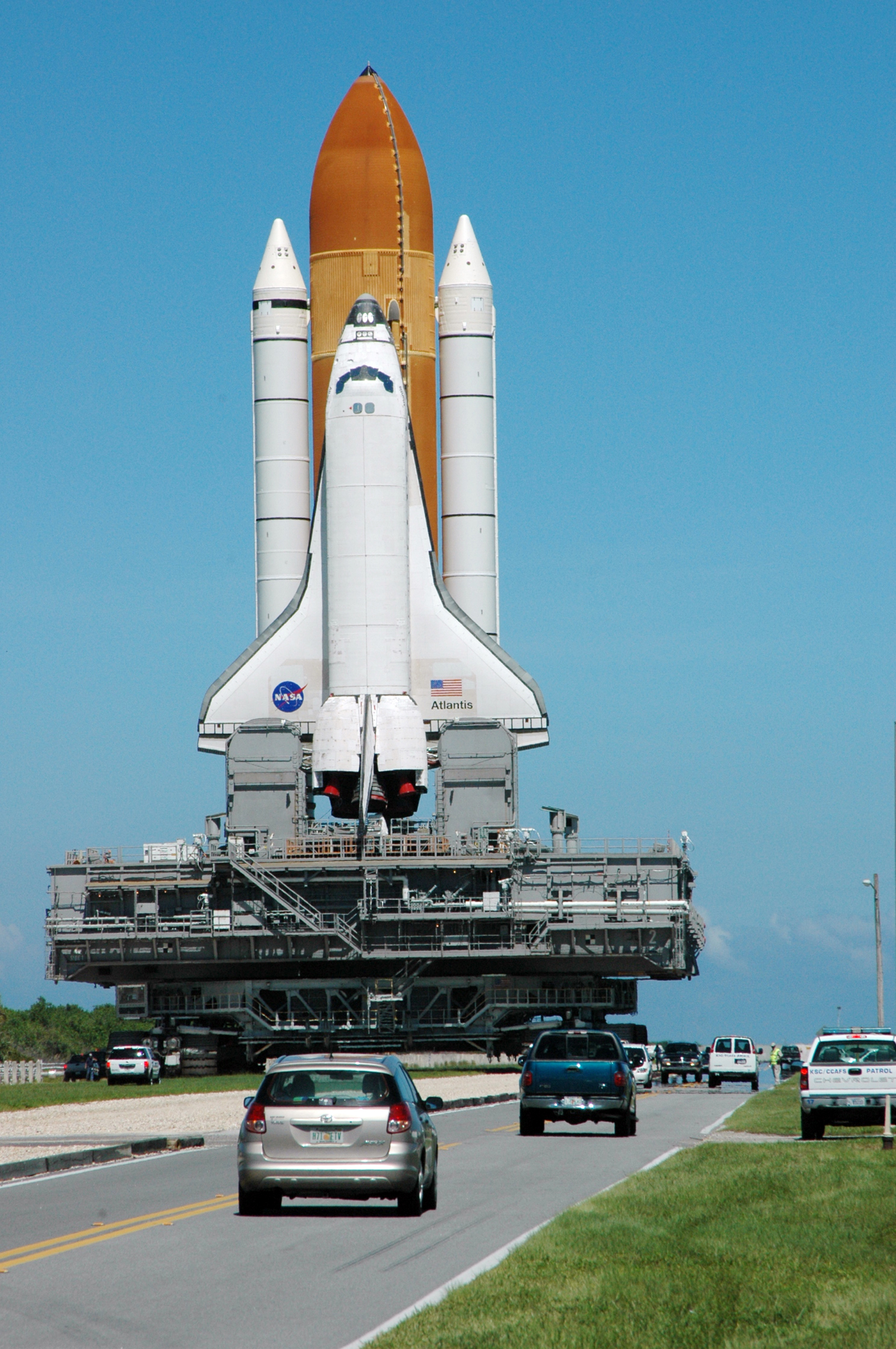
Atlantis heads back to Launch Pad 39B to ride out Ernesto

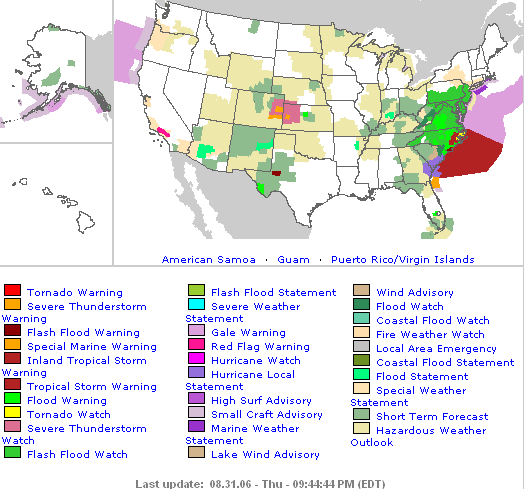
National watch and warning map showing flash flood watches and coastal flood warnings throughout the Mid-Atlantic and Southeastern United States.

On August 26, about four days prior to Ernesto striking the state, the government of Florida activated its Emergency Operations Center, while the National Guard was placed on standby, following a "warning order" to its commanders. On August 27, the Governor of Florida, Jeb Bush, issued a state of emergency because of the high risk of impact from Ernesto on the state. Officials issued a mandatory evacuation order for all visitors and non-residents in the Florida Keys about three days before the storm passed through the area. Mandatory evacuations were later issued for mobile homes and low-lying areas of Monroe, Broward, St. Lucie, and Martin counties; voluntary evacuations were also issued for barrier islands in Miami-Dade and Palm Beach counties. On August 28, forecasters issued a hurricane watch for southern Florida through the Florida Keys. When Ernesto was downgraded to tropical storm status, Governor Jeb Bush urged Florida residents to continue preparations and not wait until it regained hurricane status, as it was forecast to do by the National Hurricane Center. At least 30 shelters were opened, and tolls on four turnpike were lifted. Several schools were closed across southern Florida. The threat of the storm caused NASA to postpone the launch of Space Shuttle Atlantis at Kennedy Space Center to avoid risking damage from the storm.

The storm was initially expected to move into the Gulf of Mexico and affect people recovering from hurricanes Katrina, Rita, and Wilma in the previous year, which caused hundreds of billion in damage and left thousands of houses damaged or destroyed. There were initial fears that Ernesto would make landfall days after Hurricane Katrina's one-year anniversary, and that the levees in New Orleans might not be able to withstand a strong storm surge. Officials in New Orleans prepared buses and trains in the event that people needed to evacuate but could not. A possible path over the Gulf of Mexico oil fields, as well as tension with Iran, caused the price of oil to increase, although the prices receded when the threat of the storm receded.

On August 29, a hurricane watch was issued from the mouth of the Altamaha River in Georgia to Cape Fear, North Carolina. The next day, the watch was replaced with a tropical storm warning, which was later extended to Currituck Beach Light in Corolla, North Carolina before the storm moved ashore. In South Carolina, voluntary evacuations occurred in Charleston and Colleton counties.

On August 31 before the storm's arrival, Virginia Governor Tim Kaine declared a state of emergency, putting the Virginia National Guard and state agencies on alert and opening the state's new Emergency Operations Center in suburban Richmond. North Carolina Governor Mike Easley activated 200 National Guard troops and had other emergency teams on standby. Washington D.C. and parts of Maryland and Delaware were put on a Coastal Flood Watch and Flash Flood Watch by the National Weather Service in preparation for Ernesto.

== Impact ==
=== Caribbean ===
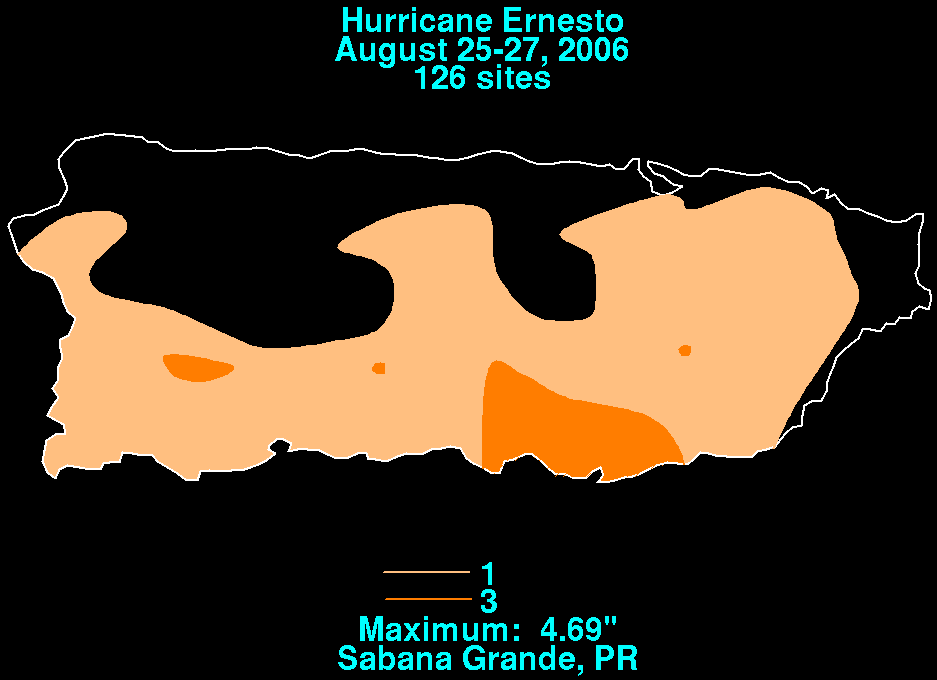
Total rainfall in Puerto Rico from Ernesto

Shortly before Ernesto developed into a tropical cyclone, the precursor tropical wave produced sustained winds of 37 mph (60 km/h) in Barbados in association with a convective downburst. On the island, the winds downed some trees, and some flooding was reported. Strong winds and rough seas damaged six fishing boats in the southern portion of the island. Squalls in Trinidad left about 12 people injured after winds destroyed several tents. Also on Trinidad, the system produced widespread flooding, which resulted in some crop damage.

Puerto Rico experienced peripheral rainfall from the cyclone as it tracked through the eastern Caribbean Sea. A two-day storm total of 4.69 inches (119 mm) occurred in Sabana Grande.

In the Dominican Republic, heavy rainfall caused river flooding and mudslides, resulting in damage to several houses. The highest rainfall report noted was 7.01 inches (178 mm) at Barahona. The rainfall also downed trees, and caused flooding to enter over 400 houses near Santo Domingo, which forced the evacuation of over 1,600 people. In Haiti, the storm caused heavy rainfall of over 11 inches (280 mm) and strong winds, causing flooding and destroying 13 homes on the island of La Gonave. In Port-au-Prince, rainfall severely damaged a bridge, isolating the southern portion of the region. Across the country, 59 homes were damaged, of which six destroyed, and a total of five deaths were reported.

Ernesto produced heavy rainfall in eastern Cuba, with Guantánamo reporting 3 inches (76 mm) in four hours. Gusty winds left some towns in the Camagüey Province without power, though overall damage was minor. There were no reports from Cuba of deaths, injuries, or major damage attributed to the storm.

=== Southeastern United States ===
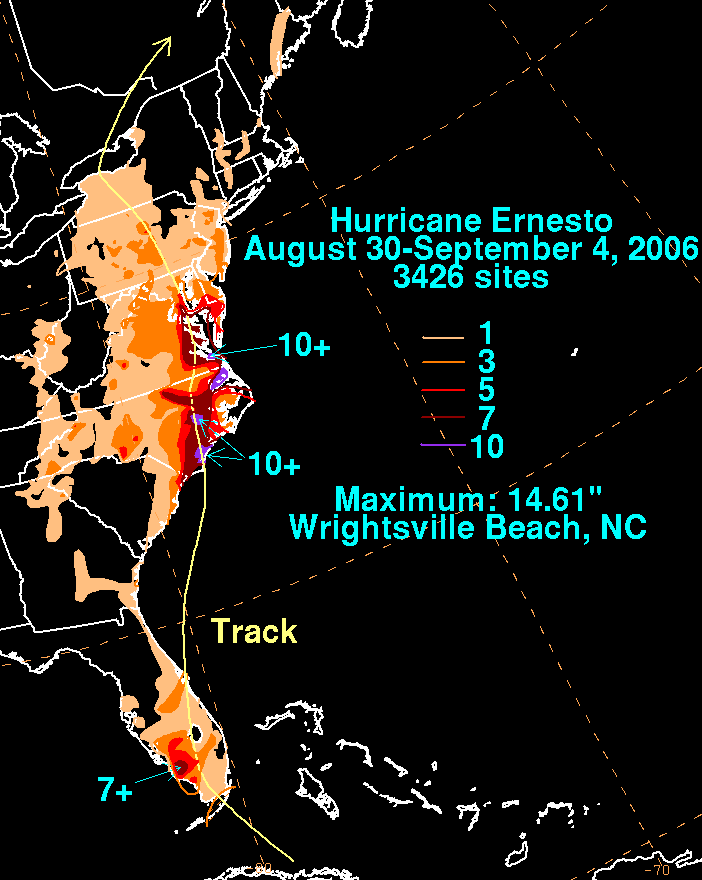
Ernesto Rainfall for United States

In the Florida Keys, Ernesto produced tropical storm force wind gusts and light rainfall, causing minor flooding. Upon making landfall in southern Florida, the storm produced a storm tide of about 1 foot (0.30 m) above astronomical tide levels, though no beach erosion was reported. Winds were fairly minor across the state, reaching 40 mph (64 km/h) at a station on Lake Okeechobee. Ernesto dropped heavy rainfall across southwest Florida, with a state maximum of 8.72 inches (221 mm) recorded at South Golden Gate. The rainfall caused the Fisheating Creek to overflow, and some flooding also occurred in portions of Collier County. Floodwaters entered at least 13 homes in Palmdale. The storm resulted in more than 150 canceled flights at Orlando International Airport, stranding several travelers. While moving through the state, Ernesto spawned two F0 tornadoes in Osceola County. One person died in each in Broward and Miami-Dade counties from traffic accidents; the deaths are considered indirectly related to Ernesto. Overall damage in the state was minor.

Passing to the east of Georgia, the storm produced light winds and rainfall near the coast. In South Carolina, the storm brought over 7 inches (180 mm) of precipitation to North Myrtle Beach, which caused ponding on roadways. Winds were generally light, peaking at around 35 mph (56 km/h), which caused isolated power outages; about 2,700 people across the state lost power. Near Charleston, the passage of the storm caused moderate flooding that left some roads closed. No significant damage was reported in the state.

Tropical Storm Ernesto made landfall in Brunswick County in the southern portion of North Carolina, producing a moderate storm surge along the Pamlico River which forced several evacuations. The storm surge reached 4–6 feet (1.2–1.8 m) in Beaufort County, flooding many homes and businesses. Just east of where it moved ashore, the storm dropped 14.6 inches (370 mm) of rainfall in Wrightsville Beach; this was the highest rainfall total associated with Ernesto in the United States. Much of the eastern portion of the state received over 3 inches (76 mm) of precipitation, and in the northeastern portion of the state, the precipitation caused flash flooding. The rainfall caused freshwater flooding in low-lying areas, as well as along major and minor roadways; the floodwaters left a 12 mi (19 km) portion of Interstate 40 closed in Duplin County. Subsequent to the storm's passage, the rainfall caused severe river flooding, with many streams and rivers overflowing their banks for several days. The Northeast Cape Fear River at Chinquapin remained in major flood stage for a week, flooding about 300 homes.

The storm moved ashore just below hurricane strength, though wind gusts near the coast were generally around 40–60 mph (64–97 km/h). Gusts peaked at 62 mph (100 km/h) in Wilmington, and the strong winds downed trees and power lines across the coastal region; about 69,000 people were left without power. Minor property damage was caused by three tornadoes spawned by the storm in eastern North Carolina. The passage of the storm caused a traffic fatality in the state. Overall damage was estimated at $80 million (2006 USD), all but $4 million of which from crop damage.

=== Mid-Atlantic States and Canada ===
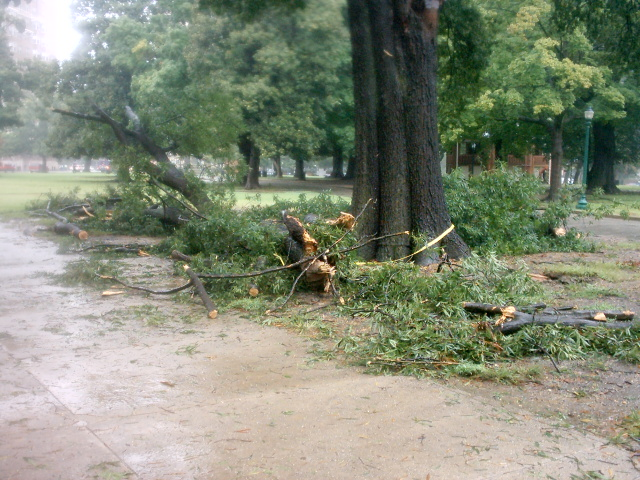
Fallen tree branch in Richmond, Virginia, caused by winds from Ernesto

Ernesto transitioned into an extratropical cyclone as it entered southern Virginia, bringing heavy rainfall which peaked at 10.6 inches (270 mm) in Wakefield, and a three-day total of 12.92 inches (328 mm) in the Princess Anne area of Virginia Beach. The precipitation caused flash flooding, which closed several roads but did not cause serious damage. The interaction between Ernesto and a strong ridge over the western Atlantic produced a tight pressure gradient, resulting in strong winds across the state; wind gusts peaked at 87 mph (140 km/h) at a station near the mouth of the York River. Strong winds downed numerous trees, including in Gloucester where two people died after a tree hit their home. The winds caused widespread power outages; Dominion Virginia Power reported about 600,000 customers as losing power some time during the storm. The storm produced a storm tide of 6.12 feet (1.87 m) near Virginia Beach; along the Chesapeake Bay, tidal flooding in combination with strong waves damaged boats and piers, and left a few homes flooded. Storm surge flooding also occurred along the Potomac River, with heavy beach erosion, light property damage, and flooded roadways reported in Alexandria. Across the state, the storm damaged or destroyed 609 houses, with damage totaling at least $118 million (2006 USD). Seven people were killed in the state, of which two directly to the storm; three of the deaths were from traffic accidents, and one person died from carbon monoxide poisoning, due to operating a power generator inside after a power outage.

In Washington, D.C., the storm produced wind gusts of up to 45 mph (72 km/h) which, in combination with heavy rainfall, resulted in a few downed tree branches and power lines. High tides left moderate damage in St. Mary's County, Maryland of about $4.4 million (2006 USD), with the damage to trees and power lines considered worse than the impact in Hurricane Isabel in 2003. In neighboring Charles County, storm surge flooding forced the evacuations of houses along the waterfront. The interaction between Ernesto and a high pressure area over eastern Canada produced high winds, heavy rainfall, tidal flooding, and high waves across the Mid-Atlantic and New England. In Delaware, the winds left 151,000 people without power, and the adverse conditions canceled several Labor Day Weekend events. A buoy in the Delaware Bay recorded a record-high wave height of 22.3 ft (6.8 m). In southern New Jersey, 80 mph (130 km/h) winds left over 200,000 buildings without power, while high waves flooded or closed several roads and bridges. Further north, between 2–4 inches (51–102 millimetres) of rain fell across Pennsylvania and New York. In Pennsylvania, there were two deaths. A seven-year-old boy died at a hospital, after a tree limb fell on him. A man was trying to rescue his Golden Retriever from a drainage steam, while he was sucked into an outflow pipe, and was found dead after being pulled out of a manhole. The rain in New York caused delays in the play at the 2006 US Open, and washed out a whole day's play.

The extratropical remnants of Ernesto moved across southern Ontario, dropping moderate rainfall of up to 2.1 inches (53 mm). Wind gusts reached 37 mph (60 km/h) near Toronto, and the winds in combination with the rainfall caused power outages when lines snapped. Hundreds were left without power, though the outages were quickly restored.

== Aftermath ==
On September 22, following a request from Virginia governor Tim Kaine, President George W. Bush declared 19 counties in Virginia as disaster areas, along with the cities of Richmond and Poquoson. The declaration allocated federal funding to assist in paying for debris removal and the rebuilding of public infrastructure damaged by Ernesto's flooding, including roads, parks, and government buildings. The city of Newport News and four additional counties were added later in the areas eligible for federal funding. In all, FEMA provided about $7.3 million (2006 USD) in assistance. Although the state of Virginia applied for individual assistance, the federal government denied the request.

Due to debris and waste being carried into waterways by flooding from Ernesto, Virginia officials closed the Chesapeake Bay to shellfishing for four days from the Chesapeake Bay Bridge–Tunnel to the mouth of the Potomac River. In Richmond, officials condemned 70 homes, prompting city workers to establish temporary homes. By five days after the storm's passage through the state, most of the 600,000 people who experienced power outages had their electricity restored. Dominion Resources's Tidewater Virginia area was among the most affected, requiring 2–3 days to restore all areas. By two days after the storm moved through the area, all major roadways were opened, though secondary roadways took longer to be cleared from debris.

Outside of Virginia, the Emergency Operation Centers in Pennsylvania, Delaware, and the District of Columbia were closed. Power crews worked to restore electricity to the affected areas across the region.

== See also ==
- Other tropical cyclones named Ernesto
- List of Florida hurricanes (2000–present)
- List of North Carolina hurricanes (2000–present)
- Hurricane Isaias (2020) – A Category 1 hurricane that had a similar track up the east coast of the United States
