= Mahesh Rodrigo =

Personal information
- Full name: Mahesha Rodrigo
- Role: Batsman/Wicket-keeper

Domestic team information
- Years: Team
- 1949–1952: Ceylon

Career statistics
Competition	FC
Matches	12
Runs scored	419
Batting average	19.95
100s/50s	1/0
Top score	135*
Catches/stumpings	6/4
- Source: CricketArchive, 8 October 2022

Mahesha Rodrigo (30 June 1928 – 7 January 2011) was a Ceylonese sportsman who represented his country in first-class cricket and rugby union.

He was educated at Royal College, Colombo and played for the First XI cricket team and First XV rugby union team where E.V. Pieris was a teammate. Rodrigo sometimes played as Ceylon's wicket-keeper and his 12 first-class appearances consisted of matches against Pakistan, the West Indies, Commonwealth XI and the Marylebone Cricket Club, amongst others. An Old Royalist, he also took the field for Ceylon in a one-day match against Don Bradman's Australians in the 1947/48 season, scoring 26.

Only once in first-class cricket did Rodrigo manage a score of 50 or more and he made the most of his form, making it to 135 before he ran out of partners. It came in a match against the West Indies, who had a bowling attack to the calibre of John Goddard, Gerry Gomez, Prior Jones, and John Trim. He had opened the batting and his innings took no less than 400 minutes.

He also played in the Clifford Cup as a rugby scrum-half and captained Ceylon internationally.
