= Ernestas =

- Gender: Male
- Language: Lithuanian
- Name day: 12 January

Origin
- Region of origin: Lithuania

Other names
- Related names: Ernest

Ernestas is a Lithuanian masculine given name. Individuals with the name Ernestas include:

- Ernestas Ežerskis (born 1987), Lithuanian basketball player
- Ernestas Galvanauskas (1882–1967), Lithuanian engineer, politician, former Prime Minister of Lithuania
- Ernestas Šetkus (born 1985), Lithuanian footballer
- Ernestas Veliulis (born 1992), Lithuanian footballer
