= Ernest Earl Lockhart =

Ernest Earl Lockhart (September 10, 1912 – July 26, 2006) was a chemist and explorer.

== Early life and education ==
Ernest Earl Lockhart was born in Boston, Massachusetts (USA) on September 10, 1912. He grew up in the Hyde Park section of Boston; Lockhart was the youngest of three children of Clinton Daniel Lockhart and Celeste Althea Westhaver, who both emigrated from Nova Scotia, Canada. E.E. Lockhart was educated in the Boston public schools, at the Chauncy Hall School, and then at Massachusetts Institute of Technology, where he earned three degrees, culminating with a PhD in biochemistry in 1938.

== Career and achievements ==
Following a year of study on fellowship at the Biochemical Institute in Stockholm, Sweden, E.E. Lockhart served as the physiologist on Rear Admiral Richard Evelyn Byrd’s United States Antarctic Service Expedition of 1939-1941 to the South Pole. For this service he received a special medal authorized by the Congress of the United States. A memorable experience on the expedition was a four-month, 400-mile field trip by dog team. He was the radio operator for his four-man party. Mount Lockhart, a mountain in the Fosdick range, is named after him.

Upon his return home, E.E. Lockhart began a career of research and teaching at M.I.T. in the field of food technology and nutrition. In 1955 he left M.I.T. to become research director at the Coffee Brewing Institute, a trade organization located in New York City. In 1965, he became assistant research director of the Coca Cola Company in Atlanta, Georgia, Georgia, where he lived until his retirement in 1978. Earl was a co-founder of the International Life Sciences Institute, a worldwide foundation that seeks to improve the well-being of the general public through the advancement of science.

== Later life and death ==
Ernest Earl Lockhart retired to his Cape Cod home in West Dennis, Massachusetts, where he and his wife Helen lived for his remaining twenty-seven years. He died at his home on July 26, 2006, at the age of 93. A family ceremony in his honor was held on the nearby Bass River, on September 10, 2006, the ninety-fourth anniversary of his birth.
