= Ernesto García Castañeda =

Mexican politician and revolutionary

Ernesto García
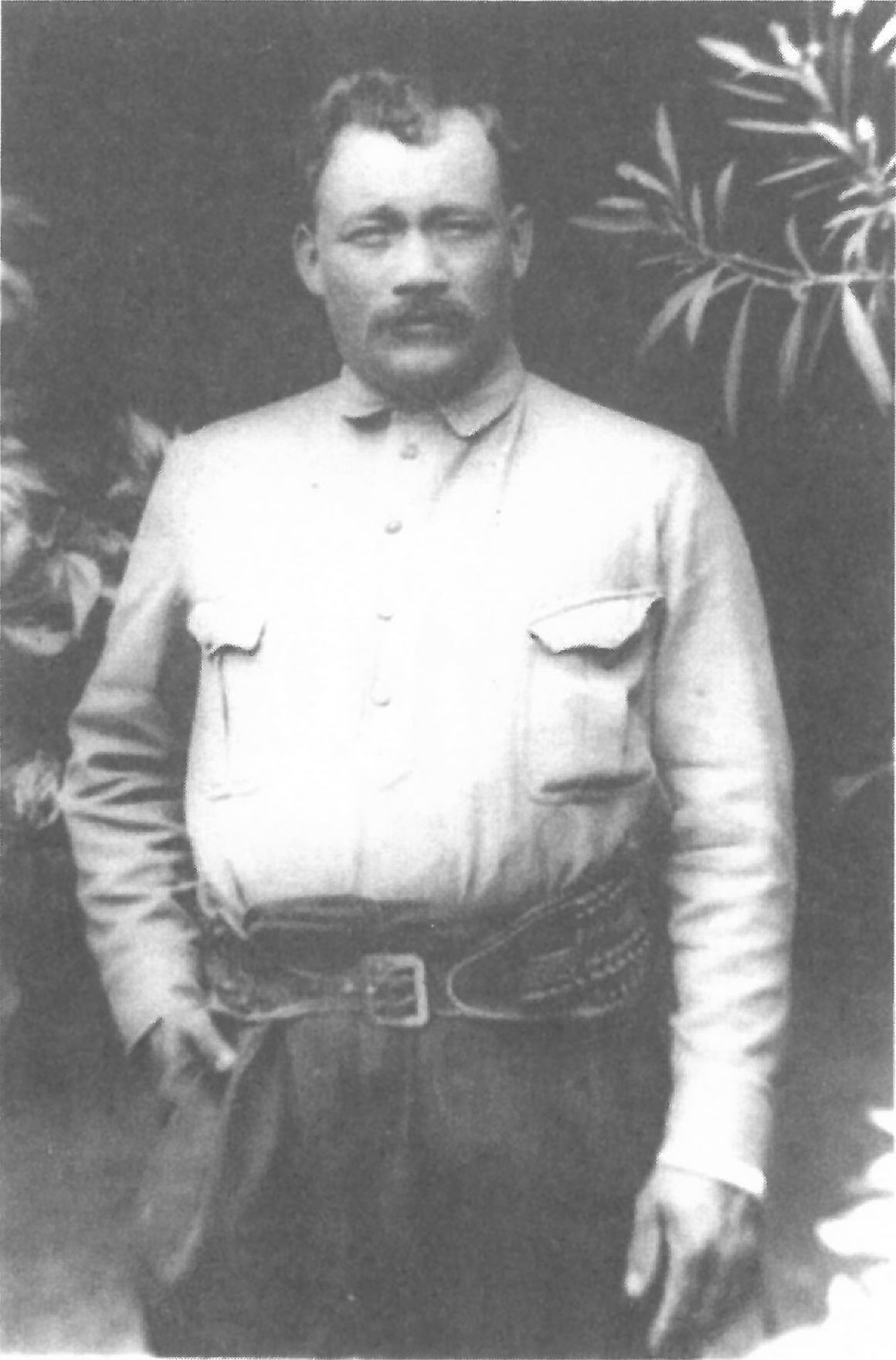
- Born: 26 February 1884; Nieves, Zacatecas, Mexico
- Died: 28 January 1955 (aged 70); Nieves, Zacatecas, Mexico
- Occupations: soldier, politician
- Spouses: Luciana Segura Burciaga (m. 1914; d. 1942) Rosa Hernández Delgado (m. 1943)

Ernesto García Castañeda (26 February 1884 – 28 January 1955) was a Mexican soldier who participated in the Mexican Revolution and the Battle of Zacatecas, serving as a colonel in Pancho Villa's army.

== Early life and military years ==
García was born on 26 February 1884 near Nieves, Zacatecas to José García Ávila (c. 1855–1935) and his first wife Marciana Castañeda Samaniego (1862–1893). After Castañeda died young from illness, her widower remarried to Ignacia Balderas Martínez in 1897 and had several more children before she died in 1901. In 1910, the Mexican Revolution broke out, prompting García to enlist and help in the cause. In total, he participated in 29 military actions, rising through the ranks and earning himself the rank of colonel through his courage and valor while fighting under general Pancho Villa.

== Later life and death ==
Shortly after the Battle of Zacatecas, he returned to Nieves and married Luciana Segura Burciaga (1890–1942) on 15 July 1914 (which was the same day of President Victoriano Huerta's resignation following the defeat of the Federal Army at the Battle of Zacatecas). In 1930, García was elected to the first of several terms as the municipal president of the municipality of Nieves (present-day General Francisco R. Murguía Municipality). After Segura died childless, García married Rosa Hernández Delgado (1914–1978) on 10 February 1943. During their marriage, they had 7 children. On 28 January 1955, García died from pneumonia at the age of 70. He is interred in the municipal cemetery of Nieves.

== Ancestry ==
Ancestors of Ernesto García Castañeda

8. Juan García
4. Luis García Castañeda
9. Petra Castañeda
2. José García Ávila
10. José María Ávila
5. Manuela Ávila Ayala
11. Josefa Ayala
1. Ernesto García Castañeda
12. Bernardino Castañeda
6. José de la Luz Castañeda Castor
13. Josefa Castor
3. Marciana Castañeda Samaniego
14. Ascensión Samaniego
7. Josefa Samaniego Herrera
15. Lorenza Herrera
