= Boca Paila Peninsula =

Mexican coastal area

Boca Paila
Native name: Sian Ka'an
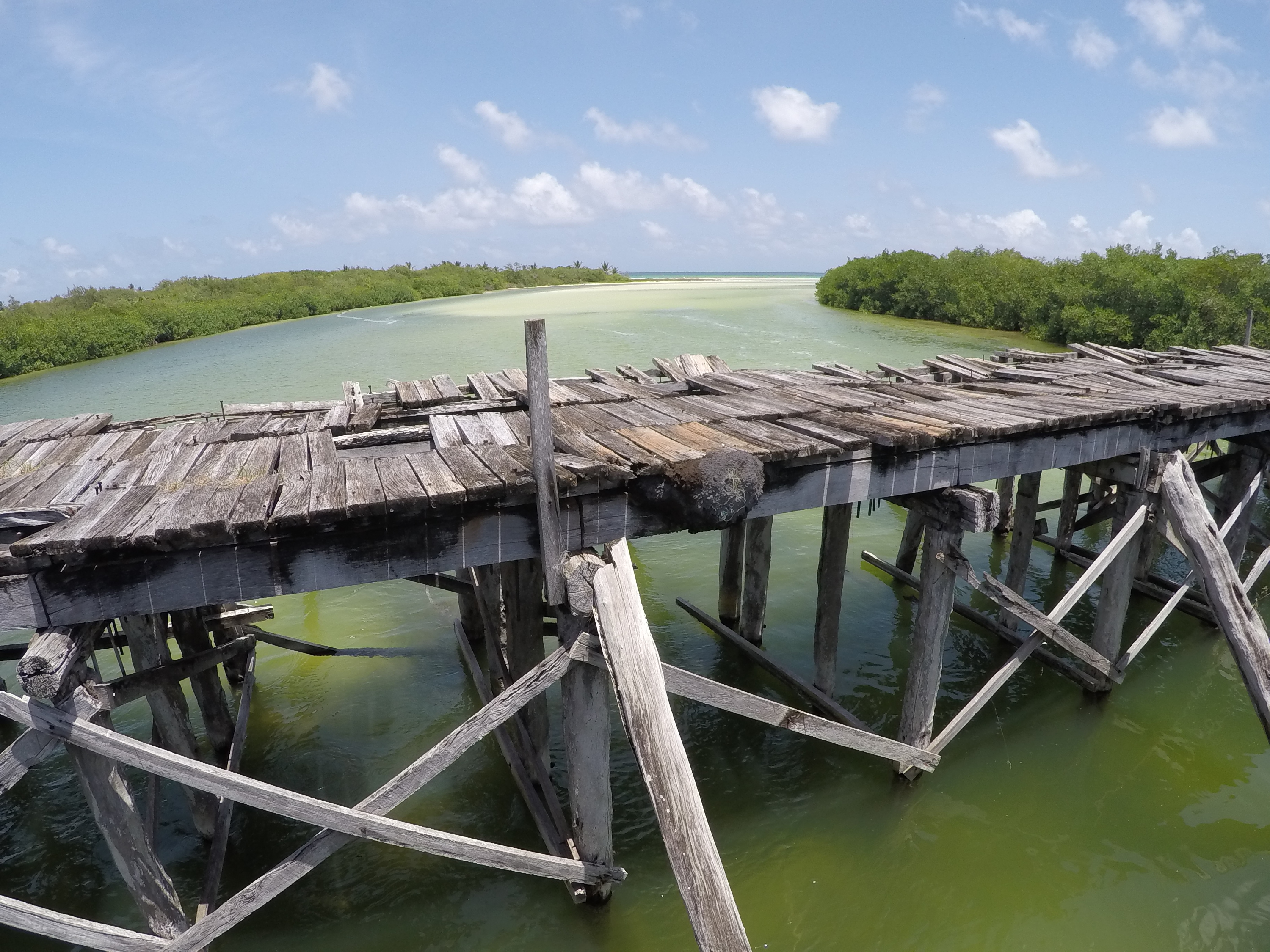
- Bridge from mainland to Boca Paila Peninsula, over Boca Paila Lagoon's outlet
- Interactive map of Boca Paila

Geography
- Location: Caribbean coast of Yucatán Peninsula, Tulum municipality, Quintana Roo state, southeastern Mexico
- Coordinates: 20.0064°N 87.4882°W

Administration
- Mexico

Demographics
- Population: Tulum village

The Boca Paila Peninsula, also known as Sian Ka'an, is on the southern Yucatán Peninsula coast, within Tulum municipality of the state of Quintana Roo in southeastern Mexico.

== Geography ==
The narrow peninsula is about 50 kilometres (31 mi) long. It separates Boca Paila Lagoon from the Caribbean Sea. The peninsula is the only land connection between the fishing village of Punta Allen on it, and the town of Tulum on the mainland, via a dirt road.

It overlooks the Great Mayan Reef in the Caribbean.

A bridge that spans the outlet of the lagoon to the Caribbean Sea is popular with sport fishers and fly-fishers.

=== Boca Paila Preserve ===
Part of the island is protected as the private Boca Paila Preserve, within the Unesco Sian Ka'an Biosphere Reserve. Within the Sian Ka’an Reserve there are 103 known mammal species and 336 known bird species. 1% of the Boca Paila Preserve section is privately owned, with 8 luxury residential estates.

== See also ==
- Tulum municipality topics
