= Ernie Price (English footballer) =

English footballer

Personal information
- Date of birth: 12 May 1926
- Place of birth: Easington, County Durham, England
- Date of death: 25 February 2013 (aged 86)
- Place of death: Taunton, England
- Position: Wing half

Senior career*
Years	Team	Apps	(Gls)
1945–1948	Sunderland	0	(0)
1948–1951	Darlington	69	(0)
1951–1953	Crystal Palace	34	(5)
1953–195x	Weymouth		
195x–1954	Bideford		
1954–1961	Taunton		

Managerial career
- 1954–1961: Taunton (player-manager)
- 1962–1963: Taunton (joint manager)
- * Club domestic league appearances and goals

Ernest "Ernie" Price (12 May 1926 – 25 February 2013) was an English footballer who made 103 appearances in the Football League playing for Darlington and Crystal Palace in the years following the Second World War. A wing half, he began his career with Sunderland, but never represented that club in the League, and also played non-league football for Weymouth, Bideford and Taunton. He was player-manager of Taunton for several years.

== Life and career ==
Price was born in Easington, County Durham, and worked as a police officer. He began his football career on the books of Sunderland, but never played for them in the Football League, and joined Third Division North club Darlington in 1948. After three seasons and 69 League appearances he signed for Crystal Palace of the Southern Section. He played around half of Palace's matches in the 1951–52 season, five the next, and then moved into non-league football in the south-west of England.

After brief spells with Weymouth and Bideford, Price was appointed player-manager of Western League Second Division club Taunton in 1954. In his second season, he led them to promotion to First Division as runners-up, and managed then for five more years in the bottom half of the higher division. He became a director of the club in 1982.

Price and wife Joyce had two children. He died in Musgrove Park Hospital, Taunton, Somerset, on 25 February 2013 at the age of 86.
