= List of storms named Ernesto =

The name Ernesto has been used for eight tropical cyclones in the Atlantic Ocean.

- Tropical Storm Ernesto (1982) – formed southwest of Bermuda and dissipated without threatening land
- Tropical Storm Ernesto (1988) – formed east of Bermuda and did not cause any damage or casualties
- Tropical Storm Ernesto (1994) – formed southwest of Cape Verde and dissipated without affecting land
- Tropical Storm Ernesto (2000) – short-lived storm that did not threaten land
- Hurricane Ernesto (2006) – Category 1 hurricane which formed near the Windward Islands, made landfall in Haiti and Cuba, struck Florida and the Carolinas, killing at least 11 people
- Hurricane Ernesto (2012) – Category 2 hurricane which made landfall in Mexico
- Tropical Storm Ernesto (2018) – formed in the North Atlantic, affected Western Europe as an Extratropical cyclone
- Hurricane Ernesto (2024) – Category 2 hurricane which caused significant flooding in Puerto Rico and made landfall in Bermuda and in the United States Virgin Islands, causing flooding and damages.
