= Ernestine Nyoka =

Ernestine Nyoka Kayiba

Deputy Minister of Budget for the Democratic Republic of the Congo
- In office December 7, 2014 – January 2017

Personal details
- Born: Ernestine Nyoka Kayiba; November 27, 1963 (age 62) Kinshasa, Democratic Republic of the Congo
- Education: University of Kinshasa
- Occupation: Lawyer

Ernestine Nyoka Kayiba is a Congolese politician who served as Deputy Minister of Budget between 2014 and 2017.

== Biography ==
Nyoka was born in Kinshasa on November 27, 1963, but her family is from Dibaya, Kasai-Occidental. She speaks four languages; French, Lingala, Swahili, and Tshiluba.

After primary school in Limete and secondary school at the Royal Athenaeum of Bukavu, she obtained her state diploma in 1984. Nyoka continued her studies at the University of Kinshasa graduating with a law degree in 1994. Between 1995 and 1998, she worked as an intern at a law firm. She opened her own law office in 2007.

Nyoka is a member of the People's Party for Reconstruction and Democracy (PPRD), and held multiple low-level positions for the party. She was a candidate in 2011 for Lukunga District, but failed to be elected. On December 7, 2014, she was appointed Deputy Minister of the Budget under Michel Bongongo. She was dismissed from this position in January 2017.
