= Ernest Dale =

American organizational theorist (1917–1996)

Ernest Dale (1917–1996) was an American academic and writer.

== Early life and education ==
Born in 1917 in Hamburg, Germany, Dale studied economics at the University of Cambridge in the late 1930s and later moved to the United States. He earned his Ph.D. from Yale University in 1950.

== Career ==
Dale taught business administration at Columbia University, Cornell University, and the Wharton School of the University of Pennsylvania, where he became professor of management in 1964.

In the 1950s and 1960s, Dale consulted for corporations, and served on the boards of Upjohn and the Tolstoy Foundation. His research was noted for using investigative interview techniques, notably leading to the recovery of lost documentation relating to DuPont's management practices.

In 1969, Dale suffered a severe stroke, significantly impairing his speech and mobility and limiting his professional activities. At the time of his death from a cerebral aneurysm in 1996, Dale was working on his memoir, provisionally titled Does It Work?.

== Writing ==
Dale authored several books, including Management: Theory and Practice (1965) and The Great Organizers (1960). His writings earned recognition such as the Newcomen Award and the McKinsey Prize, and many of his works were translated into multiple languages.
