= Ernest Veuve =

Swiss-born soldier in the U.S. Army

- Born: George Ernest Veuve; March 19, 1843; Cernier, Canton of Neuchâtel, Switzerland
- Died: June 17, 1916 (aged 73); Missoula, Montana, United States
- Burial place: Missoula Cemetery
- Military career
- Allegiance: United States of America; Union
- Branch: United States Army; Union Army
- Service years: 1864–1880
- Rank: Sergeant
- Units: 4th U.S. Cavalry; 3rd U.S. Infantry; 16th U.S. Infantry
- Conflicts: American Civil War; Indian Wars; Texas–Indian Wars
- Awards: Medal of Honor

Ernest Veuve (March 19, 1843 – June 17, 1916), born George Ernest Veuve, was a Swiss-born soldier in the U.S. Army who fought during the American Civil War and the Indian Wars as a member of the 16th U.S. Infantry, 3rd U.S. Infantry and 4th U.S. Cavalry. He was cited for bravery while battling the Kiowa and Comanche in the Staked Plains in November 1874, and fought an Indian in hand-to-hand combat for which he received the Medal of Honor.

== Biography ==
=== Early life and military career ===
George Ernest Veuve was born in Cernier, Canton of Neuchâtel, Switzerland. Although there are conflicting dates of his birth due to discrepancies in his military record, death certificate and obituary, it is generally accepted that his birth occurred on March 19, 1843. He was a coppersmith by trade and spoke German, however, little is known of his early life in Switzerland prior to emigrating to the United States in early-1864.

In an interview with James McCauley, a grand-nephew of Veuve, the 21-year-old immigrant enlisted in the U.S. Army near the end of the American Civil War. According to one story, he agreed to take the place of a wealthy man wanting to avoid the draft. Veuve served in a German-speaking division of volunteer troops and later participated in General William T. Sherman's March to the Sea campaign from April to May 1865. It was during this time that Veuve was attacked by a Confederate cavalryman and sustained a head wound from a sabre. Historians have been unable to verify these claims via the National Archives and Records Administration given that the state regiment that Veuve served with is not known.

=== Service on the frontier ===
His post-Civil War career, however, was well documented. A year after leaving volunteer service, Veuve enlisted in the Regular Army in Cincinnati, Ohio and became a member of the 16th U.S. Infantry Regiment. His 3-year enlistment term lasted from October 17, 1866, to 1869, and reenlisted at Jackson Barracks, Louisiana on December 17, 1869. During the next five years, Veuve served with the 4th U.S. Cavalry for frontier duty in the Indian Territory, West Texas and Kansas. He became a skilled scout and learned Spanish. He was also appointed a farrier during his time with the 4th Cavalry and was responsible for the shoeing and general care of the regiment's horses.

It was at the end of his second tour of duty that took part in campaigns against the Plains Indians in the Texas frontier during the early 1870s. On November 3, 1874, Veuve fought against the Kiowa and Comanche in the Staked Plains. In the midst of battle, he became separated from his company and was attacked by an Indian whom he defeated in hand-to-hand combat. Veuve was one of several men cited for bravery in this engagement and, on October 13, 1875, received the Medal of Honor for the "gallant manner in which he faced a desperate Indian".

=== Retirement and later years ===
Discharged at the end of the year, Veuve reenlisted for another 5-year term at Jackson Barracks on January 16, 1875, and was assigned to the 3rd U.S. Infantry Regiment. Almost three years later, he had become a sergeant and was among the first soldiers to be stationed at Fort Missoula in the Montana Territory arriving by wagon train on November 14, 1875. He served as the fort's quartermaster for several years. On January 22, 1880, he married 34-year-old Anna McCarty a week after leaving military service. The two had met in Missoula while McCarty, originally from County Cork, Ireland, was visiting her sister Margaret. She had previously lived in Washington, D.C. but decided to permanently settle in the area following her marriage. Though retired, Veuve was contracted by the fort's quartermaster department to haul wood to Fort Missoula. He lived with his wife and daughter, Alina Brisbin, at their East Pine Street residence until his death on June 17, 1916, at age 73. Buried at Missoula Cemetery, the arrangements of his funeral were handled by the Marsh Funeral Home and the Independent Order of Odd Fellows.

In 1957, the US Army Reserve Center in Missoula was named for and dedicated to Veuve. Shortly before Memorial Day in 2006, a new bronze plaque was placed on his grave replacing the standard government issue headstone and recognized Veuve as an MOH recipient.

== Medal of Honor citation ==
Rank and organization: Farrier, Company A, 4th U.S. Cavalry. Place and date: At Staked Plains, Tex., 3 November 1874. Entered service at: ------. Birth: Switzerland. Date of issue: 13 October 1875.

Citation:

Gallant manner in which he faced a desperate Indian.

== See also ==
- List of Medal of Honor recipients for the Indian Wars
