= Ernest Adams =

Ernest Adams may refer to:

- Ernest Adams (baker) (1892–1976), New Zealand baker, businessman and philanthropist
- Ernest Adams (politician) (1896–1976), American politician from Nebraska
- Ernest Wilcox Adams, philosopher, brother of William Y. Adams (1927–2019)
- Ernest W. Adams, founder in 1994 of the organization that became the International Game Developers Association
- Ernest Adams, a New Zealand bakery and a brand of Goodman Fielder

== See also ==
- Ernie Adams (disambiguation)
