= Ernestine Walkingstick =

Eastern Cherokee nurse and community leader in North Carolina, U.S.

Ernestine Sharon Walkingstick
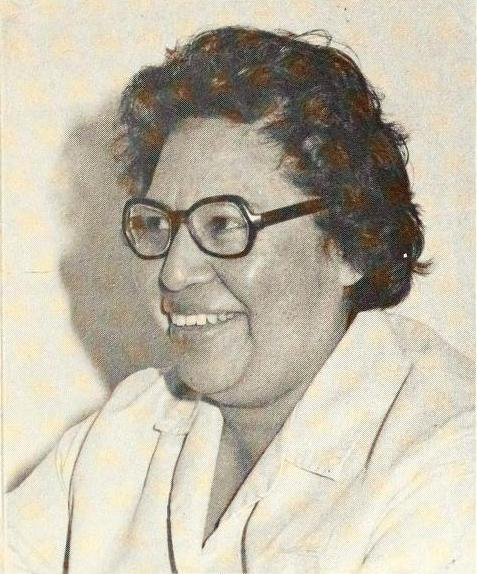
- Born: May 11, 1937; Charleston, North Carolina
- Died: July 11, 1999 (aged 62); Asheville, North Carolina
- Monuments: The Ernestine Walkingstick Domestic Violence Shelter
- Citizenship: Eastern Band of Cherokee Indians, American
- Occupations: Nurse, community leader

Ernestine Sharon Walkingstick (11 May 1937- 11 July 1999) was an Eastern Band Cherokee nurse and community leader, who established the first clinic for the Native American population in the town of Robbinsville, North Carolina, and was instrumental in founding the region's first domestic violence shelter.

== Life ==
Ernestine Sharon Walkingstick was born 11 May 1937 in Charleston Township in Swain County, North Carolina in the Qualla Boundary, the daughter of William and Mary Walkingstick.

Walkingstick graduated from Northwestern State School of Nursing in Louisiana in 1961. Returning to North Carolina, she became the director of community health nursing for the EBCI reservation, and established the first clinic for the Native American population in Robbinsville, N.C. Walkingstick also instigated and ran the Eye, Ear, Nose and Throat clinics at the Cherokee Indian Hospital in Cherokee.

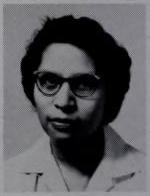
Ernestine Walkingstick in the Northwestern State University yearbook, 1959

Walkingstick was a member of the North Carolina District Nurses Association and the American Nurses Association. She was part of the Health Advisory Committee for the Head Start program, a member of the Eastern Band of Cherokee Indians (EBCI) Tribal Health Board, a board member of the Tribal Grand Council Committee, and president of the Native American Indian Women's Association. She was also the American Red Cross Chapter coordinator of the local blood drive, and chairman of the Cherokee Center for Family Services. Walkingstick was the "founding mother" of Swain/Qualla Safe, Inc., a domestic violence service. Part of its original task force, she served on its board of directors for five years.

Walkingstick retired after 35 years as a registered nurse in Swain County.

== Death and legacy ==
Ernestine Walkingstick died on 11 July 1999 at Memorial Mission Hospital in Asheville, North Carolina. The Ernestine Walkingstick Domestic Violence Shelter was established on 3 June 2002, named in her honor.
