= Ernestine Mbakou =

Cameroonian novelist

- Born: Douala, Cameroon
- Occupation: Novelist

Ernestine Mbakou is a Cameroonian novelist born in Douala. She has authored around ten books.

== Biography ==
=== Early life and beginnings ===
Passionate about reading and writing, Ernestine Mbakou initially pursued scientific studies at the Catholic University of Bamenda, where she obtained a master's degree in Health Economics, Policy, and Management. In 2018, she published her first novel, which she dedicated at the Institut Français of Cameroon in Douala. She is based in Bafoussam and works at the regional hospital while awaiting the validation of her PhD in public health.

== Bibliography ==
- 2018: Obsession
- 2019: Magam ou la vengeance dans la peau
- 2019: Père, pardonne-moi
- 2020: La maîtresse de l'ombre
- 2020: L'amour ne traverse pas l'océan
- 2020: Elle était ma co-épouse
- 2020: Le rat
- 2020: Amoureux amoureux et demi
- 2020: Hope
- 2020: La fille du milliardaire
- 2020: Je buvais le sang de ses règles
- 2020: Jacky, je trahirai ton amour
- 2020: J'ai sacrifié mon utérus
- 2020: Au fond de l'abîme
- 2020: Chantry
- 2020: Le cœur de marine
- 2020: Je suis le diable incarné
- 2020: Bébé à vendre
- 2020: J'ai vendu mon âme au diable
- 2020: Mon sang sur ses mains
- 2020: Une femme pour oncle Rob
- 2020: Wouyia ou l'innocente paie la note
- 2021: Aimer jusqu'à l'impossible
- 2021: Mon père était un sorcier
- 2023: Je te retrouverai
