= E. V. Pieris =

Sri Lankan doctor (1926–1991)

EV Pieris
- Born: 1926; Sri Lanka Ceylon
- Died: 1991 (aged 64–65); Australia
- Education: University of Colombo; Royal College Colombo
- Occupation: Consultant physician
- Title: Doctor

Ernest Victor Pieris FRCP, 1926-1991, known as "Ernie" to his contemporaries and students was a Sri Lankan physician, medical educator, a founding member of the Ceylon College of Physicians, cricketer and rugby union player.

== Education ==
Pieris was educated at Royal College Colombo. He represented the college as wicket-keeper batsman in 1943 and at rugby union football in 1941,'42 and ’43 in the first Royal team to win both legs of the match against Trinity. Team mates included Mahesh Rodrigo and Summa Navaratnam. Pieris entered the University of Ceylon to study medicine. He qualified with first class honours and distinctions in medicine, obstetrics and gynaecology. He captained the combined University rugby team of Ceylon.

== Professional life ==
He worked as registrar in the professorial medical unit, General Hospital, Colombo, and while working in the UK he obtained his membership of the Edinburgh and London Colleges by examination. He worked as a consultant physician at General Hospital Colombo from 1960 until he resigned in 1975. Perera refers to his abilities as a clinician of the finest calibre and a teacher par excellence. Puvanendran also refers to his clinical and teaching excellence. He was a founder member and served as a trustee of the Ceylon College of Physicians

== Honours ==
Pieris was elected a Fellow of the Royal College of Physicians of Edinburgh in 1972 and a Fellow of Royal College of Physicians in 1975. Following the establishment of the Ceylon College of Physicians in 1975 the award of Foundation Fellowship was conferred in 1979. The Ceylon College of Physicians conducts an annual commemorative oration each year at its Scientific sessions as the EV Pieris Oration.
