= Punta Allen =

Village in Quintana Roo, Mexico

Coordinates: 19°47′59″N 87°28′35″W

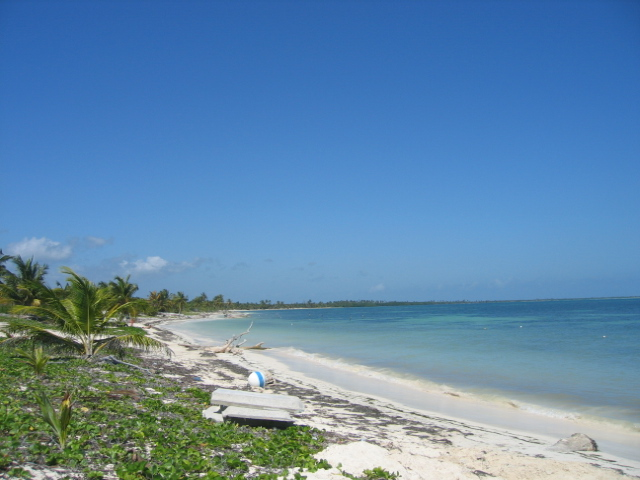
Beach at Punta Allen, Quintana Roo, Mexico

Punta Allen (Spanish pronunciation: ['punta 'alen]), (officially Javier Rojo Gómez) is the largest village in the Sian Ka'an Biosphere Reserve at the end of the Boca Paila Peninsula in Tulum Municipality in the Mexican state of Quintana Roo. It is a small Mayan fishing village with a 2010 census population of 469 inhabitants, and the only land access is by a rough 50 kilometre track.

The village has only about 4-5 blocks of sandy streets going inland from the sea and is only about 6-7 streets wide. Punta Allen has 1 generator that runs electricity to the village during two periods daily; 11am - 2pm and from 7pm - midnight.

For nutrition, the village has four mini markets, a fresh seafood store/house, a produce store/house, a lobster co-op that makes ice, and a number of restaurants along the beachfront and scattered around town.
