= Ernie Adams (Australian footballer) =

Australian rules footballer

Personal information
- Full name: Ernest Frederick Adams
- Born: 20 January 1878; Collingwood, Victoria
- Died: 28 November 1946 (aged 68); Hampton, Victoria
- Original team: Montague/Collingwood Juniors

Playing career^{1}
Years	Club	Games (Goals)
1900–01	Melbourne	11 (7)
- ^{1} Playing statistics correct to the end of 1901.

Ernie Adams (20 January 1878 – 28 November 1946) was an Australian rules footballer who played with Melbourne in the Victorian Football League (VFL).
