= Ernestine H. Wieder Singer =

American anthropologist and archaeologist (1911–1938)

Ernestine H. Wieder Singer (21 July 1911 – 3 January 1938) was an American anthropologist and archaeologist who studied the weaving and netting techniques of ancient Peruvian and other South American indigenous peoples.

== Early life and education ==
Ernestine Henrietta Wieder was born July 21, 1911, in Philadelphia, Pennsylvania to Dr. Henry S. Wieder, a physician, and Josephine M. Wieder. She later went on to study anthropology at the University of Pennsylvania, earning a BS in 1933 and an MA in 1935. In 1930, Singer married David Emil Singer, a 1929 graduate of the Textile Department at the Pennsylvania Museum and School of Industrial Arts. The couple separated in 1931.

While a graduate student at the University of Pennsylvania, Singer studied under anthropologists John Alden Mason and Vincenzo M. Petrullo, both of the University of Pennsylvania Museum of Archaeology and Anthropology.

== Research on ancient South American textiles ==
Singer's thesis, "Analysis and Distribution of Netting Techniques Among the South American Indians," discusses knotting techniques used by indigenous peoples in Chile, Peru, Bolivia, Ecuador, Colombia, Venezuela, Brazil, Paraguay, Argentina, British Guiana (modern day Guyana), French Guiana, and Dutch Guiana (modern day Suriname). Her thesis broadly considers knotting and netting techniques used by ancient tribes to create items such as fishing nets, carrying bags, and hairnets through first-hand study of archaeological and ethnographic materials. The thesis includes hand-illustrated figures of knotting techniques that Singer viewed while working for the University of Pennsylvania Museum of Archaeology and Anthropology, as well as her review of objects held at the Museum of the American Indian and the American Museum of Natural History in New York City. Singer's early research notes while studying at the University of Pennsylvania, correspondence with scholars, and other unpublished research papers on ancient Peruvian textiles are held at the Penn Museum in Philadelphia.

Singer continued research related to knotting patterns used by ancient Peruvian tribes, including examples found at Huaco Paraiso, Pachacamac, Nazca, and Trujillo. Singer's essay on technical elements of Peruvian textiles, "The Technique of Peruvian Hairnets," was published with anthropologist Harriet Newell Wardle's paper, "Belts and Girdles of the Inca's Sacrificed Women," through the Museo Nacional del Perú's Revista del Museo nacional magazine in 1936. Singer's paper supports findings from archaeological research in Pachacamac, Peru conducted by German archaeologist, Max Uhle, held in the University of Pennsylvania Museum of Archaeology and Anthropology's collections.

Singer was one of five women who participated in the 1936 annual meeting of the Society for American Archaeology held in Washington, D.C., on December 29, 1936. Singer's paper for the 1936 Society for American Archaeology considered archaeological textiles from Chira, Peru. Her research notes for papers given during the annual meeting are held at the American Philosophical Society Library in Philadelphia. Another publication by Singer, "The Looping Technique in Netting," was included in the academic journal American Antiquity in 1936.

== Later life and death ==
After earning her degrees, Singer worked as a research assistant for the American section of The University of Pennsylvania Museum of Archaeology and Anthropology. Singer was a member of the Society for American Archaeologists and the Philadelphia Anthropological Society. In 1937, preceding the publication of the 1938 edition of the International Directory of Anthropologists, Singer identified her research areas as concerning American Indian archaeology and ethnology.

Singer died on January 3, 1938, and was buried at Adath Jeshurun Cemetery in Philadelphia, Pennsylvania.

== South American indigenous communities in Singer's research ==
Singer's anthropological work on ancient textile and knotting techniques represents numerous indigenous tribes and communities across South America:

- Chʼortiʼ
- Wichí
- Guaraní
- Chiquitos
- Tariana
- Naravute
- Yawalapiti
- Bakairi
- Suyá
- Guaná
- Kayabí
- Tupí
- Munduruku
- Kuikuro
- Tucano
- Kalapalo
- Macushi
- Wai-wai
- Akawaio
- Warao
- Arahuacos
- Atacama
- Aymara
- Mapuche
- Arhuaco
- Kogi
- Wiwa
- Kankuamo
- Wayuu
- Yagua
- Chachi
- Chamacocos
- Yanonami
- Huni Kuin
- Lengua
- Ye'kuana
- Motitines
- Machiguenga
- Tumbes
- Uru
- Maracaibo
- Yaruro
- Cumiana
