= Ernie Walker (footballer) =

English footballer (1889–1958)

Personal information
- Full name: Ernest Edwin D Walker
- Date of birth: 24 November 1889
- Place of birth: Hinckley, England
- Date of death: 1958 (aged 68–69)
- Position: Winger

Senior career*
Years	Team	Apps	(Gls)
1907–1908	South Wigston Albion		
1908–1912	17th Regimental District		
1912–1915	Holwell Works		
1919	Hinckley United		
1919–1924	Leicester City	64	(3)
1924	Hinckley United		
Total		64	(3)
- * Club domestic league appearances and goals

Ernest Edwin D Walker (24 November 1889 – 1958) was an English footballer who played in the Football League for Leicester City.
