= Ernest Prodolliet =

Ernest Prodolliet (1905 — 9 November 1984) was a Swiss diplomat in the rank of a vice consul in Bregenz (Austria). During his tenure, he obtained visas for Jews persecuted by the Nazis. In its report, the Bergier commission, which thoroughly investigated Swiss government policy towards Nazi Germany and the people it persecuted, stated that Prodolliet helped several thousand refugees to enter Switzerland.

After growing up in Amriswil and his studies, he applied for the Swiss diplomatic service in 1927. He worked at the Swiss consulate in New York, where he got acquainted with his later wife Frieda (1901–1990).

When the Swiss government introduced visas for Austrians in 1938 — on 12 March 1938, Austria was annexed to Germany — Prodolliet gave Jewish persons transit visas for Switzerland, even in the full knowledge that the people would probably stay within Switzerland.

Karl Schiffer, an Austrian communist, reported:

Once again, I was filled with the wonderful sensation of hope. I could see that the Swiss official believed me .... He took my passport and stamped it with an entry visa reading "valid for two months for transit to France". The consul said, "You don’t have a French visa, of course. I’m not actually allowed to give you a transit visa. But let’s just try it."

In December 1938, he was caught by a Swiss border guard when he tried to help some Jews to pass the Swiss frontier. After discovering that he illegally issued visas to Jews, he was placed in Amsterdam, where he got active in saving more Jews from Nazi deportation trains. During a February 1939 hearing about Prodolliet's abuse of his powers, the foreign ministry investigator told him

The agency is not here to help the Jews.

Due to his disregard of official procedures, he was denied promotions in the Swiss diplomatic corps. In 1983, Prodolliet was presented a medal by the Israeli ambassador, and he was named as a Righteous Among the Nations.

Federal councillor and foreign minister Flavio Cotti ordered a report on Prodolliet's activities in 1995. The report mentioned:

His civil courage was costly for him. Because of this, he was denied several promotions which he was entitled to due to his qualities.
