= Ernesto Hein =

Chilean parliamentarian (1899–1968)

Member of the Chamber of Deputies of Chile
- In office 21 May 1933 – 21 May 1937
- Constituency: 22nd Departmental Grouping of Llanquihue and Aysén

Personal details
- Born: 26 April 1899 Puerto Montt, Chile
- Died: 28 April 1968 (aged 69) Puerto Montt, Chile
- Party: Liberal Party
- Spouse: Catharina Schlöpke Mera

Ernesto Hein Holmberg (26 April 1899 – 28 April 1968) was a Chilean politician who served in the Chamber of Deputies of Chile from 1933 to 1937. He was also mayor of Puerto Montt, Chile.

== Early life and education ==
Ernesto Hein Holmberg was born in Puerto Montt, Chile, on 26 April 1899, to Wilhelm Hein and Gustavine Holmberg, who were both German immigrants. His father was from Neustadt and his mother was from Hamburg. Hein studied at the Valdivia Commercial Institute and worked in the agricultural and livestock industry in Llanquihue Province.

== Career ==
Hein was a member of the Liberal Party. He served as mayor of Puerto Montt from 1932 to 1933. In the 1932 election he won a seat in the Chamber of Deputies of Chile representing the 22dn Department Grouping of Llanquihue and Aysén. During his tenure he was a member of the National Defence commission.

== Personal life ==
Hein married Catharina Schlöpke Mera. He died in Puerto Montt on 28 April 1968.

== Works cited ==
- "Luis Raúl Puga Monsalve". Library of the National Congress of Chile. Archived from the original on 19 October 2026.
