= Deaths in November 2014 =

The following is a list of notable deaths in November 2014.

Entries for each day are listed alphabetically by surname. A typical entry lists information in the following sequence:

- Name, age, country of citizenship and reason for notability, established cause of death, reference.

== November 2014 ==
=== 1 ===
- Leslie Armour, 83, Canadian philosopher.
- Joel Barnett, Baron Barnett, 91, British politician, MP for Heywood and Royton (1964–1983), Chief Secretary to the Treasury (1974–1979).
- Gustau Biosca, 86, Spanish football player (Barcelona) and coach.
- Beverly Schmidt Blossom, 88, American dancer and choreographer, cancer.
- Harold Blumenfeld, 91, American classical composer.
- Ben Cayenne, 70, Trinidadian Olympic runner (1968), cancer.
- Anne Cluysenaar, 78, Belgian-born Welsh poet and writer.
- Jackie Fairweather, 46, Australian triathlete and long-distance runner, suicide.
- Alberto Johannes Först, 87, German-born Brazilian Roman Catholic prelate, Bishop of Dourados (1990–2001).
- Olle Häger, 79, Swedish journalist and television producer.
- Hugues Le Bars, 64, French film music composer.
- Brittany Maynard, 29, American activist for assisted suicide, physician-assisted suicide.
- Abednigo Ngcobo, 64, South African footballer (Kaizer Chiefs), heart attack.
- Piauí, 27, Brazilian footballer (Atlético-PR), shot.
- Jean-Pierre Roy, 94, Canadian baseball player (Brooklyn Dodgers).
- Donald Saddler, 96, American dancer and choreographer.
- Ivor Seemley, 85, English footballer (Sheffield Wednesday, Stockport County, Chesterfield).
- Michael H. Shamberg, 62, American music video producer (True Faith).
- Vira Silenti, 83, Italian actress, traffic collision.
- Thomas W. Sneddon Jr., 73, American politician and district attorney, cancer.
- Bernard Spitzer, 90, American real estate developer and philanthropist.
- Wayne Static, 48, American singer and musician (Static-X), multiple drug intoxication.
- Hajime Tamura, 90, Japanese politician.
- Kazuko Yanaga, 67, Japanese voice actress (Ace wo Nerae!, Armored Trooper Votoms), sepsis.

=== 2 ===
- Paul J. Andree, 90, American football coach.
- Acker Bilk, 85, British jazz clarinetist ("Stranger on the Shore").
- Jesse Branson, 72, American basketball player (Philadelphia 76ers, New Orleans Buccaneers).
- Dick Breaden, 69-70, Australian rugby league footballer.
- Michael Coleman, 58, American Chicago blues guitarist, singer and songwriter, heart failure.
- Pierre Daix, 92, French journalist, writer and biographer (Pablo Picasso).
- Valentina Dimitrova, 58, Bulgarian Olympic athlete (1980).
- Herman Eisen, 96, American immunologist and cancer researcher.
- Mary Froning, 80, American baseball player (AAGPBL).
- Roger Halvorson, 80, American politician.
- G. L. Harriss, 89, British medieval historian.
- Fumiko Hayashida, 103, American subject of iconic photo of internment of Japanese Americans.
- Alan Milliken Heisey Sr., 86, Canadian political activist and author.
- Veljko Kadijević, 88, Croatian Yugoslav general (Yugoslav People's Army), Minister of Defence (1988–1992).
- Larry Latham, 61, American animator, producer and director (The Smurfs, TaleSpin, Challenge of the GoBots), cancer.
- Georgi Milanov, 62, Bulgarian ice hockey player and coach (national team).
- Herman Sarkowsky, 89, German-born American businessman and sports executive (Portland Trail Blazers, Seattle Seahawks).
- Nikolaus Senn, 88, Swiss banker.
- Drago Štritof, 91, Yugoslav Olympic athlete.
- Vladimir Suchilin, 64, Soviet footballer.
- Finis Tasby, 75, American blues singer (The Mannish Boys), complications from a stroke.
- Shabtai Teveth, 89, Israeli historian.
- Robert Tripe, 41, New Zealand actor (Shortland Street, Power Rangers).
- Chris White, 78, American jazz bassist.

=== 3 ===
- Sadashiv Amrapurkar, 64, Indian actor (Ardh Satya, Sadak), lung infection.
- Denise Apt, 84, American politician.
- Trevor Brown, 81, South African cricketer.
- Richard Calder, 71, American CIA official, heart attack.
- Geoff Cox, 79, English footballer (Torquay United).
- Jeremy Dale, 34, American comic book artist (GI Joe), acute disseminated encephalomyelitis.
- Mariam Fakhr Eddine, 81, Egyptian actress.
- Klaus Kreuzeder, 64, German saxophonist.
- Jim Leonard, 64, American photographer.
- Herbert Walter Levi, 93, American arachnologist.
- Tinus Linee, 45, South African rugby union player (Western Province, national team), motor neurone disease.
- Tom Magliozzi, 77, American automotive expert and radio personality (Car Talk), complications from Alzheimer's disease.
- Augusto Martelli, 74, Italian composer (Il dio serpente), conductor, arranger and television personality.
- Landy Scott, 95, American midget car racing driver.
- Sandra Slaughter, American software engineer and world record holder.
- Ivan Stojmenović, 57, Serbian-born Canadian mathematician and computer scientist, traffic collision.
- Nina Timofeeva, 79, Russian ballet dancer.
- Gordon Tullock, 92, American economist.

=== 4 ===
- Admire Rakti, 6, Japanese Thoroughbred racehorse, won Caulfield Cup (2014), cardiac arrest.
- Araldo, 6, British-born Thoroughbred racehorse, won The Bart Cummings (2013), euthanised.
- Princess Kristine Bernadotte, 82, Norwegian-born Swedish princess, widow of Prince Carl Bernadotte.
- Janet Carr, 81, Australian physiotherapist and academic.
- Leigh Chapman, 75, American actress (The Man from U.N.C.L.E.) and screenwriter (Dirty Mary, Crazy Larry, The Octagon), cancer.
- Colin Docker, 88, English Anglican clergyman, Bishop of Horsham (1975–1991).
- Joe English, 58, Irish yachtsman, sailor and sailmaker, Alzheimer's disease.
- Jack Fitzsimons, 84, Irish architect and activist.
- Derek Hogg, 84, English footballer (Leicester City).
- Gerard W. Hughes, 90, English Jesuit priest and writer, Chaplain of University of Glasgow (1967–1975).
- Mag Raj Jain, 84, Indian social activist.
- Sam Mattingly, 88, American entrepreneur.
- Enrique Olivera, 74, Argentine politician, Chief of Government of Buenos Aires (1999–2000).
- Richard Schaal, 86, American actor (The Mary Tyler Moore Show, Phyllis, Trapper John, M.D.).
- Annæus Schjødt Jr., 94, Norwegian barrister and World War II veteran.
- John W. Sears, 83, American lawyer and politician.
- Liudvikas Simutis, 79, Lithuanian politician.
- George Edgar Slusser, 75, American writer and professor.
- James Mwewa Spaita, 82, Zambian Roman Catholic prelate, Archbishop of Kasama (1990–2009).
- S. Donald Stookey, 99, American inventor (CorningWare).
- Eddie Stuart, 83, South African footballer.

=== 5 ===
- Iuri Akobia, 77, Georgian chess strategist.
- John Gordon Davis, 78, Rhodesian writer.
- Alexei Devotchenko, 49, Russian actor and anti-Kremlin activist.
- Lane Evans, 63, American politician, member of the U.S. House from Illinois's 17th district (1983–2007), complications from Parkinson's disease.
- Wally Grant, 86, American Hall of Fame ice hockey player (University of Michigan).
- Roy Hartle, 83, English footballer (Bolton Wanderers).
- Séamus Heery, 87, Irish Gaelic football player (Meath).
- Manitas de Plata, 93, French flamenco guitarist.
- Don McLaren, 81, New Zealand equine pharmaceutical businessman and Thoroughbred racehorse breeder.
- Abdelwahab Meddeb, 68, Tunisian-born French poet, Islamic scholar, essayist and novelist, lung cancer.
- Vladimir Movsisyan, 80, Armenian politician.
- Jack Nelson, 82, American Olympic swimmer (1956) and swimming coach (1976), Alzheimer's disease.
- Hans Nijman, 55, Dutch mixed martial artist, shot.
- Hajime Okayasu, 77, Japanese film editor (Black Rain, Doraemon, Warm Water Under a Red Bridge), pneumonia.
- Alicia Oliveira, 71, Argentine jurist and politician.
- Mario Pietruzzi, 96, Italian football player and manager (Alessandria).
- Jean-Jacques Rousseau, 67, Belgian filmmaker, injuries from being hit by car.
- Luciano Soli, 77, Italian Olympic field hockey player.

=== 6 ===
- Évelyne Baylet, 101, French company director.
- Maggie Boyle, 57, English folk singer and musician, cancer.
- Lionel Caero, 63, Bolivian Olympic sprinter.
- Werner Callebaut, 62, Belgian philosopher.
- Timothy R. Corcoran, 64, American politician.
- Pierre-Louis Dieufaite, 31, Haitian actor, assassinated.
- Egbert Fernandes, 73, Kenyan Olympic hockey player.
- Philipp Fürst, 77, German Olympic gymnast (1960, 1964).
- Virgil M. Getto, 90, American politician, member of the Nevada Assembly.
- Len Jordan, 94, New Zealand rugby league player (Ponsonby, Auckland, national team).
- Victor Kostetskiy, 73, Russian actor.
- Sir Tommy Macpherson, 94, British Army officer and businessman.
- Carole Mathews, 94, American actress (The Californians).
- Sam Mbah, 50-51, Nigerian author, lawyer and activist.
- Gerald E. Miller, 95, American vice admiral.
- Alok Nembang, 41, Nepalese film director, suicide by hanging.
- Jones Osborn, 93, American newspaper editor, publisher and politician, member of the Arizona State Legislature (1971–1991).
- Carl Persson, 94, Swedish jurist and politician, Governor of Gothenburg and Bohus (1979–1980) and Halland (1978–1979), Police Commissioner (1964–1978).
- Vivienne Price, 83, British music educator.
- Sir Anthony Reeve, 76, British diplomat, Ambassador to Jordan (1988–1991) and South Africa (1991–1994), High Commissioner to South Africa (1994–1996).
- Rick Rosas, 65, American session musician (Etta James, Joe Walsh, Crosby, Stills, Nash & Young).
- William Rosenberg, 94, Danish actor.
- Jaroslav Šíp, 83, Czech Olympic basketball player.
- Fred Stürmer, 87, Luxembourgish Olympic boxer.
- Naoki Tanemura, 78, Japanese railway writer.
- Bruce Walker, 42, American football player (New England Patriots).

=== 7 ===
- Turki Mash Awi Zayid Al Asiri, 39, Saudi Arabian terrorist, shot.
- Alex Bain, 78, Scottish footballer (Motherwell, Huddersfield Town, Falkirk). (death announced on this date)
- John Bradley, 60, Irish historian and archaeologist.
- Ferenc Csentery, 76, Hungarian-born American sculptor.
- Connie Dion, 96, Canadian ice hockey player (Detroit Red Wings).
- Bob Ewbank, 86, American football player.
- Lincoln D. Faurer, 86, American air force officer, Director of the National Security Agency (1981–1985).
- Zoltán Gera, 91, Hungarian actor (Escape to Victory, Sunshine, Music Box).
- Bill Green, 97, English Battle of Britain fighter pilot.
- Rudolf Halin, 80, German graph theorist (Halin graph).
- Francis Harvey, 89, Irish poet.
- Kajetan Kovič, 83, Slovene writer.
- Ian Michael, 99, British academic, Vice-Chancellor of the University of Malawi (1964–1973). (death announced on this date)
- Allen Ripley, 62, American baseball player (Boston Red Sox, San Francisco Giants).
- Rough Habit, 28, New Zealand Thoroughbred racehorse, euthanised.
- Dan Samuel, 4th Viscount Samuel, 89, British businessman and aristocrat.
- Torbjørn Sikkeland, 91, Norwegian physicist.
- Solwhit, 10, French-bred Irish-trained Thoroughbred racehorse, fall while training.
- Juan Taverna, 66, Argentine footballer (Club Atlético Banfield).
- Dwivedula Visalakshi, 85, Indian Telugu language writer.
- Alex Way, 89, Australian VFL player (Carlton).

=== 8 ===
- Donald Allegrucci, 78, American politician, member of the Kansas Senate.
- Harry Arnold, 73, British journalist.
- Brian Connor, 68, American pastor and exorcist.
- Phil Crane, 84, American politician, member of the U.S. House from Illinois's 13th (1969–1973), 12th (1973–1993) and 8th (1993–2005) districts, lung cancer.
- Ivey Dickson, 95, English pianist.
- Volkmar Gessner, 77, German sociologist.
- Luigi Gorrini, 97, Italian World War II pilot.
- Hannes Hegen, 89, German illustrator and caricaturist.
- Ivan Ionaș, 58, Moldovan politician, MP (since 2010).
- Archibald Johnstone, 90, Canadian businessman and politician, Senator for Prince Edward Island (1998–1999).
- Robert Langs, 86, American psychiatrist, amyloidosis.
- Michael Leighton, 60, Australian politician, member of the Victorian Legislative Assembly for Preston (1988–2006).
- Joseph Melrose, 69, American diplomat, ambassador to Sierra Leone (1998–2001).
- Meesai Murugesan, 84, Indian actor and musician.
- Don Paul, 89, American football player (Los Angeles Rams).
- Giovan Battista Pirovano, 77, Italian footballer (Fiorentina).
- Hugo Sánchez Portugal, 30, Mexican sports commentator and footballer, carbon monoxide poisoning.
- Ricardo Rusticucci, 68, Argentine Olympic sport shooter.
- Ernie Vandeweghe, 86, American basketball player (New York Knicks).
- Audrey White, 87, English model and author.
- Sammy Wilson, 82, Scottish footballer (Celtic).
- Otto Ziege, 88, German racing cyclist.

=== 9 ===
- Gabriel Abossolo, 75, Cameroonian footballer.
- Rubén Alvarez, 53, Argentine golf player, cancer.
- Saud bin Muhammed Al Thani, 48, Qatari royal and art collector.
- Annemarie Buchner, 90, German Alpine skier, Olympic silver and bronze medalist (1952), German Sportswoman of the Year (1948).
- Jens Bugge, 84, Norwegian Supreme Court judge.
- Russell Christopher, 84, American operatic baritone.
- Patricia Devries, 84, British Olympic figure skater (1952).
- Fred Doty, 90, Canadian football player (Toronto Argonauts).
- Juan Antonio Flores Santana, 87, Dominican Roman Catholic prelate, Archbishop of Santiago de los Caballeros (1992–2003), fall.
- Eugene Grazia, 80, American ice hockey player, Olympic champion (1960).
- Éric Koechlin, 64, French Olympic slalom canoeist (1972).
- Jeanne Macaskill, 82, New Zealand painter.
- Óscar Moncada, 78, Nicaraguan politician, President of the National Assembly (1999–2001), MP (1997–2011), heart attack.
- R. A. Montgomery, 78, American author (Choose Your Own Adventure).
- Willy Monty, 75, Belgian Olympic racing cyclist (1960).
- Kelvin Moore, 57, American baseball player (Oakland Athletics), heart failure.
- Phil Motherwell, 67, Australian actor (Mad Max).
- Myles Munroe, 60, Bahamian evangelist, plane crash.
- M. V. Raghavan, 81, Indian politician.
- Sammy Reid, 75, Scottish footballer (Motherwell, Berwick Rangers).
- Paul Sarvela, 54, American educator, professor of health education.
- Nikola Simić, 80, Serbian actor.
- Orlando Thomas, 42, American football player (Minnesota Vikings), complications from amyotrophic lateral sclerosis.
- Joe Walsh, 71, Irish politician, Minister for Agriculture and Food (1992–1994, 1997–2004).
- Annette Polly Williams, 77, American politician, member of the Wisconsin State Assembly (1981–2011).

=== 10 ===
- Whitey Adolfson, 82, American football and wrestling coach.
- Frank Allen, 70, British crystallographer.
- Marianne Alopaeus, 96, Finnish-born Swedish author.
- Nikki Beare, 86, American feminist, journalist, and lobbyist.
- Talgat Bigeldinov, 92, Soviet military aviator.
- Josip Boljkovac, 93, Croatian politician, Interior Minister (1990–1991).
- Clifford Branstad, 90, American politician.
- Steve Dodd, 86, Australian actor (Gallipoli, The Matrix, Quigley Down Under).
- Brian Farrell, 85, British-born Irish broadcaster and journalist.
- Emmitt Ford, 70, American politician, member of the Tennessee House of Representatives (1974–1981).
- J. F. Gonzalez, 50, American author, complications from cancer.
- Wayne Goss, 63, Australian politician, Premier of Queensland (1989–1996), brain tumour.
- Sally Hardcastle, 69, British broadcaster (Woman's Hour, The World Tonight).
- Homer Heck, 78, American politician, member of the West Virginia Senate (1980–1984, 1988–1992).
- Syed Mainul Hossain, 63, Bangladeshi structural engineer and architect (National Martyrs' Memorial), cardiac arrest.
- Johar, 15, American Thoroughbred racehorse.
- Jovian, 20, American-born lemur actor (Zoboomafoo), kidney failure.
- Ernest Kinoy, 89, American writer (Roots, Dimension X, The Defenders), pneumonia.
- John Hans Krebs, 87, American politician, member of the U.S. House from California's 17th district (1975–1979).
- John Spencer Letts, 80, American federal judge.
- Geula Nuni, 72, Israeli actress (Sallah Shabati, I Like Mike) and singer, cancer.
- Doc Paskowitz, 93, American surfer.
- Al Renfrew, 89, American ice hockey player and coach (Michigan Wolverines).
- Shi Changxu, 93, Chinese material scientist.
- Ken Takakura, 83, Japanese actor (The Yakuza, Black Rain), malignant lymphoma.
- Gaetano Varcasia, 55, Italian actor and voice actor, cancer.
- Ruth Whitaker, 77, American politician, member of the Arkansas Senate (2001–2013).
- Tomas Young, 34, American anti-Iraq War activist, subject of Body of War.

=== 11 ===
- Ike Atkinson, 88, American master sergeant and convicted drug trafficker.
- Ruth Begun, 102, German-American physicist.
- Big Bank Hank, 58, American rapper (The Sugarhill Gang), kidney complications from cancer.
- Servando Chávez Hernández, 78, Mexican politician, Governor of Michoacán (1970–1974).
- Jessie Clarke, 99, Australian social worker, welfare officer, and refugee advocate.
- John Doar, 92, American lawyer and civil rights activist, heart failure.
- Joe Dunne, British soldier.
- Johnny Dyer, 75, American blues musician.
- Mark Dyer, 84, American Episcopal prelate, Bishop of Bethlehem, Pennsylvania (1982–1995).
- James Erb, 88, American composer, arranger and musicologist.
- Mike Faulk, 61, American politician and judge, Tennessee State Senator (2008–2012), throat and liver cancer.
- Rebekah Gibbs, 41, British actress (Casualty), breast cancer.
- Philip G. Hodge, 94, American materials scientist.
- John Kotz, 84, British politician, Mayor of Hackney.
- Erik Sture Larre, 100, Norwegian Resistance member during World War II.
- Caetano Lima dos Santos, 98, Brazilian bishop of the Roman Catholic Church.
- Jan Lindhardt, 76, Danish theologian and writer, Bishop of Roskilde (1997–2008), Alzheimer's disease.
- Harry Lonsdale, 82, American scientist, entrepreneur and politician, heart failure.
- Deirdre Murphy, 55, American-Irish Olympic cyclist, cancer.
- Zillur Rahman Siddiqui, 86, Bangladeshi academic.
- Donald F. Steiner, 84, American biochemist.
- Tjokorda Raka Sukawati, 83, Indonesian civil engineer (Sosrobahu).
- Carol Ann Susi, 62, American actress (The Big Bang Theory, Cats & Dogs, Just Go with It), cancer.

=== 12 ===
- Robert Keith Alexander, 84, Canadian politician.
- Mirta Arlt, 91, Argentine writer, translator, professor and researcher, heart attack.
- John Briscoe, 66, South African environmental engineer, colon cancer.
- Mary Burkett, 90, English supporter of the arts.
- Buddy Catlett, 81, American jazz musician.
- Ravi Chopra, 68, Indian film producer and director, lung ailment.
- Warren Clarke, 67, British actor (Dalziel and Pascoe, A Clockwork Orange, Top Secret!).
- George Hillocks Jr., 80, American academic.
- David Mackay, 80, British architect.
- Carlos Emilio Morales, 75, Cuban jazz guitarist.
- Richard Pasco, 88, British actor (Yesterday's Enemy, Rasputin the Mad Monk, Mrs. Brown).
- Jiří Petr, 83, Czech agroscientist.
- Grover C. Richardson, 66, American politician.
- Marge Roukema, 85, American politician, member of the U.S. House from New Jersey's 7th and 5th districts (1981–2003), Alzheimer's disease.
- Valery Senderov, 69, Soviet-born Russian dissident.
- Viktor Serebryanikov, 74, Soviet-born Ukrainian footballer (Metalurh Zaporizhya, Dynamo Kyiv, Soviet national team).
- Bernard Stonehouse, 88, British polar scientist (Stonehouse Bay, Mount Stonehouse).
- Chhel Vayeda, 79, Indian film set designer and art director.

=== 13 ===
- Jahangir Mohammad Adel, Bangladeshi politician.
- María José Alvarado, 19, Honduran beauty pageant winner, Señorita Honduras (2014), shot.
- Manoel de Barros, 97, Brazilian poet.
- Kakha Bendukidze, 58, Georgian politician, heart failure.
- Bill Brewster, 90, Canadian politician, member of the Yukon Legislative Assembly (1982–1996).
- Terry Bulloch, 98, British pilot.
- Mike Burney, 76, English saxophonist (Wizzard), cancer.
- Jo Cox-Ladru, 91, Dutch Olympic gymnast.
- Gus Cremin, 93, Irish Gaelic football player (Kerry GAA).
- Krystian Czernichowski, 84, Polish Olympic basketball player.
- Alvin Dark, 92, American baseball player (Boston Braves, New York Giants) and manager (San Francisco Giants, Cleveland Indians), Alzheimer's disease.
- Mioljub Denić, 88-89, Serbian chief physician, cardiologist, basketball player and coach.
- Marion Downs, 100, American audiologist.
- Sir William Dugdale, 2nd Baronet, 92, British football executive and aristocrat, Chairman of Aston Villa (1975–1982).
- Dennis Elwell, 84, British astrologer.
- Robert A. Falk, 88, American farmer and politician, member of the Minnesota House of Representatives (1969–1972).
- Armand V. Feigenbaum, 92, American quality control expert and businessman.
- Alexander Grothendieck, 86, German-born French mathematician, winner of the Fields Medal (1966).
- Toshitami Kaihara, 81, Japanese politician, traffic collision.
- Howie Lee, 83, Canadian Olympic ice hockey player (1956).
- Ma Faxiang, 61, Chinese Navy vice admiral, suicide by jumping.
- Chris Meffert, 71, American politician, member of the Florida House of Representatives.
- Richard E. Morgan, 77, American political scientist.
- Lucilla Morlacchi, 78, Italian actress (The Leopard).
- Reg Parker, 87, British rugby league player and international coach.
- Irving Peress, 97, American dentist, investigated by Army-McCarthy hearings for alleged communist espionage.
- Don Pinhey, 83, American football player (Ottawa Rough Riders).
- Tom Regner, 70, American football player (Houston Oilers).
- Jim Storrie, 74, Scottish footballer (Leeds United).
- Edward Summer, 68, American writer and director.
- Del Youngblood, 79, American college baseball coach.

=== 14 ===
- Marius Barnard, 87, South African surgeon.
- Henri Brincard, 74, French Roman Catholic prelate, Bishop of Le Puy-en-Velay (since 1988).
- Stephen Bragg, 90, British engineer.
- Diem Brown, 34, American reality show personality (The Challenge), ovarian and colon cancer.
- Wally Buhaj, 73, Australian footballer.
- Jane Byrne, 81, American politician, Mayor of Chicago (1979–1983).
- Albert E. Castel, 86, American historian and author.
- Alberto Madruga da Costa, 74, Azorean politician and businessman.
- Philip Joseph Cox, 92, British officer.
- Dave Dephoff, 86, New Zealand long jumper and decathlete.
- Tulio Halperín Donghi, 88, Argentine historian.
- Eugene Dynkin, 90, Soviet-born American mathematician.
- Bobby Epps, 82, American football player (New York Giants).
- Edgar Housepian, 86, American neurosurgeon.
- Kjell Hvidsand, 73, Norwegian footballer.
- Adib Jatene, 85, Brazilian cardiologist and politician, Minister of Health (1992, 1995–1996), heart attack.
- Glen A. Larson, 77, American writer and producer (Battlestar Galactica, Knight Rider, Magnum, P.I.), esophageal cancer.
- James A. Lebenthal, 86, American businessman, heart attack.
- Robert E. Littell, 78, American politician, member of the New Jersey Senate (1992–2008).
- Francisco Neto, 70, Portuguese Olympic sport shooter.
- Michael O'Brien, 81, Irish hurling manager (Cork GAA).
- Zaki Osman, 82, Egyptian international footballer.
- Morteza Pashaei, 30, Iranian pop singer, stomach cancer.
- Peter Rajah, 63, Malaysian footballer (Sabah, national team), heart attack.
- Viktor Šnajder, 80, Croatian Olympic sprinter.
- Lino Spiteri, 76, Maltese politician, Finance Minister (1981–1983, 1996–1997).
- Afonso Van-Dúnem, 73, Angolan diplomat and politician.
- Paul Vaughan, 89, British journalist.
- Cherry Wainer, 79, South African musician (Lord Rockingham's XI).

=== 15 ===
- Max Birnstiel, 81, Swiss molecular biologist, heart failure.
- Jack Bridger Chalker, 96, British World War II artist.
- Bunny Briggs, 92, American tap dancer.
- Ashok K. Chandra, 66, Indian computer scientist.
- Lucien Clergue, 80, French photographer.
- Sylvia Edlund, 69, Canadian botanist.
- Nissim Eliad, 95, Israeli politician.
- Leslie Feinberg, 65, American transgender activist and author.
- Hunter J. Francois, 90, Saint Lucian politician and government minister.
- Dame Mary Glen-Haig, 96, British Olympic fencer.
- Werner Haase, 80, German Olympic skier.
- Richard F. Johnston, 89, American ornithologist and author.
- Wycliffe Kiyingi, 85, Ugandan playwright.
- Valéry Mézague, 30, Cameroonian footballer (Montpellier, Sochaux, national team).
- Serge Moscovici, 89, Romanian-born French social psychologist.
- Terence Rees, 86, British microbiologist.
- John Sparnon, 71, New Zealand rugby league player.
- John Wansacz, 78, American politician, member of the Pennsylvania House of Representatives, leukemia.
- Reg Withers, 90, Australian politician, Senator (1966, 1968–1987), Lord Mayor of Perth (1991–1994).
- Marvin Zelen, 83, American biostatistician.

=== 16 ===
- Héctor Arredondo, 44, Mexican actor (Capadocia), pancreatic cancer.
- Javier Azagra Labiano, 91, Spanish Roman Catholic prelate, Bishop of Cartagena (1978–1998).
- Antoni Maria Badia i Margarit, 94, Spanish Catalan linguist and philologist.
- Beatrice Bruteau, 84, American painter.
- Andrew Bucci, 92, American artist.
- Charles Champlin, 88, American film critic and writer, Alzheimer's disease.
- Jovan Ćirilov, 83, Serbian theatrologist and author.
- Esther M. Conwell, 92, American physicist.
- Ian Craig, 79, Australian Test cricketer.
- Nan Dieter-Conklin, 88, American radio astronomer.
- Whammy Douglas, 79, American baseball player (Pittsburgh Pirates).
- Babak Ghorbani, 25, Iranian wrestler, Asian Games champion (2010), suicide by pesticide poisoning.
- Dessie Hughes, 71, Irish racehorse trainer.
- Juan Joseph, 27, American football player and coach (Edmonton Eskimos), shot.
- Kim Ja-ok, 63, South Korean actress, lung cancer.
- Sik Kok Kwong, 95, Hong Kong Buddhist monk, President of the Hong Kong Buddhist Association (1966–2014).
- Binney Lock, 82, New Zealand journalist and newspaper editor (The Press), cancer.
- Jadwiga Piłsudska, 94, Polish pilot and architect, World War II flying officer for the Air Transport Auxiliary.
- Carl Sanders, 89, American politician, Governor of Georgia (1963–1967), complications from a fall.
- Robert Sonkowsky, 83, American academic and actor.
- José Viejo, 65, Spanish Olympic racing cyclist.

=== 17 ===
- Ahmad Aladdin, 73, Jordanian general.
- Peter Allen, 92, Canadian surgeon.
- Natale H. Bellocchi, 88, American diplomat, Ambassador to Botswana (1985–1988), Chairman of the American Institute in Taiwan (1990–1995).
- Ron Bertram, 90, Australian lawyer and politician.
- Willy Burgdorfer, 89, Swiss-born American scientist, Parkinson's disease.
- William Bussing, 81, American ichthyologist.
- Omar Chabán, 62, Argentine impresario, convicted of the República Cromañón nightclub fire, Hodgkin's lymphoma.
- John T. Downey, 84, American CIA operative, held captive in China for 20 years, pancreatic cancer and Parkinson's disease.
- Dr. Flori, 35, Albanian singer-songwriter, drug overdose.
- Victor Elmaleh, 95, Moroccan-born American businessman.
- Bill Frenzel, 86, American politician, member of the U.S. House from Minnesota's 3rd district (1971–1991), cancer.
- Edwin Granai, 83, American politician.
- Stanisław Majcher, 78, Polish footballer.
- Warren Murdock, 70, New Zealand cricketer.
- Rokurō Naya, 82, Japanese voice actor (Saint Seiya, Yu Yu Hakusho, Eureka Seven: AO).
- Corky Nelson, 75, American football player and coach.
- Jan Thomas Njerve, 87, Norwegian painter.
- Ilija Pantelić, 72, Serbian Yugoslav footballer.
- Jimmy Ruffin, 78, American soul singer ("What Becomes of the Brokenhearted").
- Ray Sadecki, 73, American baseball player (St. Louis Cardinals, New York Mets), blood cancer.
- J. V. Shetty, 78, Indian banker.
- Patrick Suppes, 92, American philosopher.
- Nancy Teeters, 84, American economist.

=== 18 ===
- Alvin T. Amaral, 86, American politician.
- Dave Appell, 92, American musician, musical arranger and record producer.
- Lino Celaya, 65, Mexican politician, MP for Oaxaca (2003–2006), pancreatic cancer.
- Kottarapattu Chattu Kuttan, 94, Sri Lanka doorman.
- Fanny Colonna, 80, French-Algerian sociologist and anthropologist.
- Pepe Eliaschev, 69, Argentine journalist and writer, pancreatic cancer.
- Göran Graffman, 83, Swedish actor and film director.
- Ernest W. Johnson, 90, American physiatrist and electromyographer.
- Ted Leehane, 91, Australian rules footballer (Essendon).
- Ahmad Lozi, 89, Jordanian politician, Prime Minister (1971–1973), President of the Senate (1984–1997).
- Manzur Hasan Mintu, 74, Bangladeshi footballer and sports commentator.
- Geertje Lycklama à Nijeholt, 76, Dutch scientist and politician, rector of the International Institute of Social Studies (1990–1995), member of the Senate (1995–2003).
- Shahzada Alam Monnoo, 80, Pakistani industrialist and politician.
- Thomas Nilsson, 88, Swedish Olympic long-distance runner.
- C. Rudraiah, 67, Indian film director (Aval Appadithan).
- Ana Raquel Satre, 89, Uruguayan operatic soprano.
- Ismo Villa, 60, Finnish Olympic ice hockey player.

=== 19 ===
- René Abeliuk, 83, Chilean lawyer, academic and politician.
- Joseph B. Benedetti, 85, American politician, member of the Virginia House of Delegates (1985–1986) and Senate (1986–1998), cardiovascular disease.
- Roy Bhaskar, 70, British philosopher.
- Jeremiah Coffey, 81, Irish-born Australian Roman Catholic prelate, Bishop of Sale (1989–2008).
- Bengt Eriksson, 83, Swedish Nordic combined skier, Olympic silver medalist (1956).
- Paddy Fagan, 84, Irish footballer.
- Pete Harman, 95, American businessman, opened first KFC franchise.
- Ray Heffernan, 79, Australian cricketer.
- Ramón Hoyos, 82, Colombian Olympic racing cyclist (1956, 1960), Pan American Games champion (1955), heart attack.
- Marianne Humeniuk, 67, Canadian Olympic swimmer.
- Richard A. Jensen, 80, American theologian.
- Otieno Kajwang, 55, Kenyan politician, Senator for Homa Bay (since 2013), MP for Mbita (1998–2013), cardiac arrest.
- Gholam Hossein Mazloumi, 64, Iranian footballer (Esteghlal, national team), stomach cancer.
- Mike Nichols, 83, German-born American director (The Graduate, Angels in America, Spamalot), Oscar winner (1968), cardiac arrest.
- Leonard Olivier, 91, American Roman Catholic prelate, Auxiliary Bishop of Washington (1988–2004).
- Sebelio Peralta Álvarez, 75, Paraguayan Roman Catholic prelate, Bishop of Villarrica del Espíritu Santo (1990–2008) and San Lorenzo (since 2009).
- Robert E. Sheriff, 92, American geophysicist.
- Jon Stallworthy, 79, English academic, poet and literary critic.
- Teeton Mill, 25, British Thoroughbred racehorse. (death reported on this date)
- Mercy Williams, 67, Indian politician, cancer.

=== 20 ===
- Allan J. Baker, 71, Canadian ornithologist.
- John Bartram, 89, Australian Olympic runner (1948).
- Márcio Thomaz Bastos, 79, Brazilian politician, Minister of Justice (2003–2007), lung failure.
- Joe Bonner, 66, American jazz pianist.
- Marian Brown, 87, American media personality.
- Arthur Butterworth, 91, English composer and conductor.
- Ben Collins, 93, American football player, traffic accident.
- N. J. Dawood, 87, Iraqi translator.
- Neal L. First, 84, American biologist, complications from cancer.
- Murray Gittos, 94, New Zealand fencer.
- Charlie Hall, 84, American politician, member of the Florida House of Representatives (1980–1982).
- Han Pao-teh, 80, Taiwanese architect and curator.
- Charles Harrison, 81, American basketball player (Harlem Globetrotters).
- Anthony Hayde, 81, New Zealand Olympic field hockey player.
- Iain Hesford, 54, English footballer (Blackpool, Sunderland).
- Jimmy Heung, 64, Hong Kong film producer and director, cancer.
- Samuel Klein, 91, Polish-born Brazilian magnate (Casas Bahia).
- Stanley McDonald, 94, Canadian-born American businessman, founder of Princess Cruises.
- David Menasche, 41, American teacher and author, brain cancer.
- Cayetana Fitz-James Stuart, 18th Duchess of Alba, 88, Spanish aristocrat.
- Sharad Thakre, 46, Indian cricketer.

=== 21 ===
- Abdullah H. Abdur-Razzaq, 82, American activist.
- Leif Andersen, 78, Norwegian rower.
- Patrick Ascione, 61, French composer.
- Zdeněk Bobrovský, 80, Czech Olympic basketball player.
- Anne Cocker, 94, Scottish rose breeder.
- Richard Eder, 82, American journalist (Los Angeles Times, The New York Times), pneumonia.
- Selma Epstein, 87, American concert pianist.
- J. C. Gilbert, 92, American politician.
- Borden Mace, 94, American film producer (Animal Farm).
- Vicente Paterno, 89, Filipino politician, Senator (1987–1992).
- Sir Robert Richardson, 85, British army lieutenant general.
- Paul von Ragué Schleyer, 84, American chemist.
- Heather Southcott, 86, Australian politician.
- Mary Lou Studnicka, 83, American baseball player (Rockford Peaches).
- Sir John Sutton, 82, British RAF officer, Lieutenant Governor of Jersey (1990–1995).
- Wang Kun, 89, Chinese opera singer and educator.

=== 22 ===
- Robert E. Allen, 90, American politician.
- Fiorenzo Angelini, 98, Italian Roman Catholic prelate, President of the Pontifical Council for the Pastoral Care of Health Care Workers (1985–1996).
- Margaret Aston, 82, British historian.
- Lewis Baltz, 69, American visual artist and photographer.
- Claire Barry, 94, American singer (The Barry Sisters).
- Jean-Paul Béchat, 72, French engineer and chief executive (Snecma, Safran).
- Petrit Bushati, 66, Albanian diplomat.
- Frank Caldwell, 93, British army major general, Assistant Chief of the General Staff (1972–1974).
- Elvira Cisneros, 90, American activist.
- Derek Deadman, 74, English actor (Time Bandits, Brazil, Harry Potter and the Philosopher's Stone), diabetes.
- James O. Ellison, 85, American federal judge.
- Horst Fügner, 91, German motorcycle racer.
- Don Grate, 91, American baseball (Philadelphia Phillies) and basketball player (Sheboygan Red Skins).
- Bernard Heidsieck, 85, French poet, respiratory failure.
- Dick Ivey, 67, Australian rules footballer (North Melbourne).
- Chelva Kanaganayakam, 62, Sri Lankan-born Canadian translator and literary scholar, heart attack.
- Larry Kelm, 49, American football player (Los Angeles Rams), fall.
- John H. Land, 94, American politician, Mayor of Apopka, Florida (1950–1968, 1971–2014), stroke.
- Bean van Limbeek, 70, Dutch Olympic sport shooter.
- Ralph Nachtigal, 80, American politician.
- Mary H. Odom, 93, American politician, member of the North Carolina House of Representatives (1971–1972) and Senate (1975–1976).
- Marcel Paquet, 67, Belgian philosopher.
- Émile Poulat, 94, French historian and sociologist.
- Art Quirk, 76, American baseball player (Baltimore Orioles, Washington Senators).
- Michael Shanahan, 71, American journalist (Associated Press).
- William Waffle Thomas, 94, American Air Force officer and Air Force One pilot.
- Carole Toy, 66, Australian Olympic archer.

=== 23 ===
- Georges Badin, 87, French poet and painter.
- Ida Ballasiotes, 78, American politician, member of the Washington House of Representatives.
- Marion Barry, 78, American politician, Mayor of the District of Columbia (1979–1991, 1995–1999), cardiac arrest.
- Dorothy Cheney, 98, American tennis player.
- Bob Conners, 80, American radio personality (WTVN), mantle cell lymphoma.
- Hélène Duc, 97, French actress.
- Bob Gottlieb, 74, American college basketball coach (UW-Milwaukee, Jacksonville).
- Anne Cowdrey, 14th Lady Herries of Terregles, 76, English racehorse trainer.
- Mark Keyworth, 66, English rugby union player (Swansea, national team), heart attack.
- Allan Kornblum, 65, American book publisher and poet, complications from leukemia.
- Stanley Lebor, 80, English actor (Ever Decreasing Circles, Flash Gordon, A Bridge Too Far).
- Joseph Francis Maguire, 95, American Roman Catholic prelate, Bishop of Springfield, Massachusetts (1977–1991).
- Desmond Mangham, 90, British army major general.
- Mikhail of Asyut, 93, Egyptian prelate, Coptic Metropolitan of Asyut.
- John Neal, 82, English football player and manager (Wrexham, Middlesbrough, Chelsea).
- Murray Oliver, 77, Canadian ice hockey player (Boston Bruins, Minnesota North Stars, Toronto Maple Leafs), heart attack.
- Clive Palmer, 71, British folk musician (The Incredible String Band).
- Pat Quinn, 71, Canadian ice hockey coach and executive (Philadelphia Flyers, Toronto Maple Leafs, Vancouver Canucks).
- Rudolf Reichling, 90, Swiss politician and Olympic rower.
- Alla Sizova, 75, Russian ballet dancer.
- David Stoddart, 77, British geographer.
- Anne Walton, 62, Canadian Olympic swimmer.

=== 24 ===
- Erzsébet Balázs, 94, Hungarian Olympic silver medallist gymnast (1948).
- Dickson D. Bruce, 68, American historian.
- Louis Casely-Hayford, 78, Ghanaian engineer.
- Mickey Champion, 89, American blues singer, stroke.
- Murli Deora, 77, Indian politician, Minister of Petroleum and Natural Gas (2006–2011).
- Jorge Herrera Delgado, 53, Mexican politician, Mayor of Durango, Durango (2004–2007), MP for Durango (since 2012), pancreatic cancer.
- Reg Foulkes, 91, English footballer (Norwich City).
- Alberto Gollán, 96, Argentine media executive.
- Otto Hageberg, 78, Norwegian literary historian.
- Harry Haythorne, 88, Australian ballet master and artistic director (Queensland Ballet, Royal New Zealand Ballet).
- Peter Henderson, 88, New Zealand rugby union (Hawke's Bay, Wanganui, national team) and rugby league (Huddersfield) player and sprinter, British Empire Games bronze medalist (1950).
- Gordon Hill, 87, American quartet bass singer.
- Frederick Hodges, 93, British Olympic diver.
- Annie Lee, 79, American artist.
- Nenad Manojlović, 57, Serbian Yugoslav water polo player and manager (national team).
- James D. Mockler, 75, American politician.
- Michael John O'Hara, 81, British geologist.
- Emy Storm, 89, Swedish actress (Emil i Lönneberga), stroke.
- Viktor Tikhonov, 84, Soviet ice hockey player (VVS Moscow, Dynamo Moscow) and coach (national team).
- Henry Woo, 85, Canadian politician, MLA for Edmonton-Sherwood Park (1979–1986).

=== 25 ===
- Irvin J. Borowsky, 90, American publisher.
- William B. Callaway, 71, American landscape architect.
- Albert K. Cohen, 96, American criminologist.
- Sitara Devi, 94, Indian Kathak dancer.
- Joseph Thomas Dimino, 91, American Roman Catholic prelate, Archbishop for the Military Services (1991–1997).
- Joanna Dunham, 78, English actress (The Greatest Story Ever Told).
- Brison D. Gooch, 89, American historian.
- Vladimir Gundartsev, 69, Soviet biathlete, Olympic champion (1968), world champion (1969).
- Petr Hapka, 70, Czech composer.
- Denham Harman, 98, American biogerontologist and professor emeritus (UNMC).
- Eladio Herrera, 84, Argentine Olympic boxer.
- Rudolf Hoppe, 92, German chemist.
- Ruth B. Loving, 100, American civil rights activist.
- Jack Manley, 85, American football player (San Francisco 49ers).
- Aurelio Milani, 80, Italian footballer (Internazionale).
- Geoff Mullen, 67, Australian draft resister.
- Karl Maria Udo Remmes, 60, German photographer.
- Hans Scarsini, 90, Austrian Olympic ice hockey player (1956).
- Norman A. Scotch, 85, American medical anthropologist.
- Peter Wescombe, 82, British diplomat and co-founder of Bletchley Park Trust.

=== 26 ===
- Tuğçe Albayrak, 22, German student, injuries sustained in an attack.
- Sir Arthur Bonsall, 97, British civil servant, Director of GCHQ (1973–1978).
- Carl Brettschneider, 82, American football player (Chicago Cardinals, Detroit Lions).
- Don Dee, 71, American basketball player (Indiana Pacers), Olympic champion (1968).
- Annemarie Düringer, 89, Swiss actress (Count Five and Die).
- Malcolm Finlayson, 84, British footballer (Wolverhampton Wanderers).
- Frankie Fraser, 90, British gangster, surgical complications.
- Marvin Leonard Goldberger, 92, American physicist, President of the California Institute of Technology (1978–1987).
- Mary Hinkson, 89, American dancer and choreographer, pulmonary fibrosis.
- Elena Jahn, 76, American painter, complications from scleroderma.
- Fikret Kırcan, 94, Turkish Olympic footballer (1948).
- János Konrád, 73, Hungarian water polo player, Olympic champion (1964).
- Arthur Montford, 85, Scottish football commentator.
- Guy Montserret, 79, French Olympic swimmer (1956).
- Christine Palau, 84, French Olympic gymnast.
- Tapan Raychaudhuri, 90, Indian historian.
- Sabah, 87, Lebanese singer and actress.
- Aaron Shirley, 81, American physician and civil rights activist.
- Calvin L. Stevens, 91, American chemist.
- Gordon Curran Stewart, 75, American publisher and speechwriter, emphysema.
- Gilles Tremblay, 75, Canadian ice hockey player (Montreal Canadiens).
- Peter Underwood, 91, British author, broadcaster and paranormalist.
- William W. Wiedrich, 83, American Episcopal prelate, Bishop of Chicago (1991–1997).
- Ángel Tulio Zof, 86, Argentine football player and coach (Rosario Central).

=== 27 ===
- Lester Bernstein, 90, American journalist.
- Célia Bertin, 94, French writer.
- Wanda Błeńska, 103, Polish physician and missionary.
- Curley Bridges, 80, American singer, pianist and songwriter, cancer.
- Wynn Chamberlain, 87, American artist, filmmaker and author.
- Richard T. Cooney, 81, American politician, member of the New Hampshire House of Representatives.
- Ledio Fanucchi, 83, American football player (Chicago Cardinals).
- August Gottschalk, 92, German footballer.
- Phillip Hughes, 25, Australian cricketer, vertebral artery dissection leading to subarachnoid haemorrhage.
- P. D. James, 94, English crime novelist (The Children of Men, Death Comes to Pemberley).
- Valeri Kalachikhin, 75, Russian Olympic champion volleyball player (1964).
- Jack Kyle, 88, British rugby union player and surgeon.
- Mordecai Lawner, 86, American actor (Annie Hall, Ghostbusters II, Raw Deal).
- William Lonc, 84, Canadian Jesuit priest, translator and physicist.
- Israel Ledesma Magaña, 60, Mexican politician, MP for the State of Mexico (2009–2012), cancer.
- Stanisław Mikulski, 85, Polish theatre and film actor (Stawka większa niż życie).
- Fernance B. Perry, 93, Bermudian businessman.
- Terry Sanderson, 62, Canadian lacrosse coach and manager.
- Arne Serck-Hanssen, 89, Norwegian Olympic rower and physician (1948).
- Melbourne Tierney, 87, Welsh rugby footballer, complications from dementia.
- Meta Truscott, 97, Australian diarist and historian.
- Viktor Ulyanich, 65, Russian boxer.
- Wang Yung-tsai, 93, Taiwanese industrialist (Formosa Plastics Group).
- Frank Yablans, 79, American film producer and screenwriter, President of Paramount Pictures (1971–1975).

=== 28 ===
- Said Akl, 102, Lebanese poet, writer, playwright and language reformer.
- Dale Armstrong, 73, Canadian drag racer and crew chief, complications of sarcoidosis.
- Emmon Bach, 85, American linguist.
- Henri Bini, 83, Monegasque fencer.
- Brumsic Brandon Jr., 87, American cartoonist, Parkinson's disease.
- Chespirito, 85, Mexican playwright, actor and screenwriter (El Chavo del Ocho, El Chapulín Colorado), heart failure.
- Roy Asberry Cooper Jr., 87, American lawyer and political strategist.
- Jean Dacquay, 86, French racing cyclist.
- Luis Estévez, 83-84, Cuban-born American fashion designer and costume designer.
- Thomas W. Hungerford, 78, American mathematician.
- László Kapolyi, 82, Hungarian politician.
- Donald Lamberton, 87, Australian economist.
- Danny Lee, 95, American special effects artist (Bonnie and Clyde, Bedknobs and Broomsticks, The Black Hole), Oscar winner (1972).
- Richard B. Mather, 101, American sinologist.
- Tom Moyer, 95, American businessman and amateur boxer.
- Frances Nero, 71, American soul and jazz singer.
- A. L. Rees, 65, British writer and film historian.
- Lucidio Sentimenti, 94, Italian footballer (Juventus, Lazio).
- Bunta Sugawara, 81, Japanese actor (Torakku Yarō, Spirited Away, Tales from Earthsea), liver cancer.
- Marie Zeigler, 77, American baseball player (Grand Rapids Chicks), complications from Parkinson's disease.

=== 29 ===
- Dwayne Alons, 68, American politician, member of the Iowa House of Representatives (since 1999), renal cancer.
- Olugbenga Ashiru, 66, Nigerian politician, Minister of Foreign Affairs (2011–2013).
- Ajit Kumar Banerjee, 83, Indian environmentalist.
- Dick Bresciani, 76, American baseball executive and spokesperson, leukemia.
- Robert L. Clifford, 89, American associate justice (New Jersey Supreme Court).
- Luc De Vos, 52, Belgian musician (Gorki) and writer, organ failure.
- Bernard Fernandez, 96, American Negro league baseball player.
- Rowland G. Freeman III, 92, American rear admiral.
- John Goodlad, 94, Canadian educational researcher.
- Roger Hallmark, 68, American country singer, cancer.
- Martha S. Hearron, 71, American biostatistician.
- John Holroyd, 79, English civil servant.
- Hal Huggins, 77, American dentist and dental advocate.
- Imperial Call, 25, Irish racehorse. (death announced on this date)
- Brian Macdonald, 86, Canadian dancer and choreographer.
- Leonard C. Meeker, 98, American politician and diplomat.
- Mark Strand, 80, Canadian-born American poet and writer, United States Poet Laureate (1990–1991), liposarcoma.
- Jim Van Wagner, 59, American football player (New Orleans Saints).
- Ahmad Wartam, 79, Singapore international footballer.
- Pyotr Zayev, 61, Soviet-born Russian boxer, Olympic silver medalist (1980).

=== 30 ===
- Radwa Ashour, 68, Egyptian writer and academic.
- Mari Bjørgan, 64, Norwegian actress.
- Paul Buissonneau, 87, Canadian actor and theatre director.
- Mel Casas, 85, American artist, cancer.
- Sir Fred Catherwood, 89, British politician and Christian writer, MEP (1979–1994).
- Qayyum Chowdhury, 82, Bangladeshi painter.
- Jean-Baptiste Donnet, 91, French chemist.
- William B. Finneran, 78, American politician, small cell lung cancer.
- Jarbom Gamlin, 53, Indian politician, Chief Minister of Arunachal Pradesh (2011), liver thrombosis.
- Go Seigen, 100, Chinese-born Japanese Go player.
- Kazuko Hara, 79, Japanese opera composer, heart failure.
- Kent Haruf, 71, American novelist (Plainsong).
- Marvin C. Helling, 91, American football player and coach.
- Norm Holland, 90, New Zealand jockey.
- Rahim Jahani, 67, Afghan singer.
- J. Edward Kidder Jr., 92, American archaeologist and art historian.
- Ronnie Koes, 77, Canadian football player.
- Martin Litton, 97, American environmentalist and editor.
- Anthony Dryden Marshall, 90, American theatrical producer, CIA intelligence officer and ambassador.
- Phil May, 70, Australian Olympic athlete (1968).
- Paolo Mosca, 71, Italian writer and television presenter.
- Ian Player, 87, South African conservationist.
- Pete Rodriguez, 74, American college football coach (Western Illinois Leathernecks), complications from surgery.
- Maurice Saxby, 89, Australian academic and author.
- Friedel Schirmer, 88, German Olympic decathlete.
- Trading Leather, 4, Irish Thoroughbred racehorse, Irish Derby winner (2013), euthanized after race injury.
- Mary Burke Washington, 88, American economist.
- Elizabeth Young, Baroness Kennet, 91, British journalist and author.
- Walt Yowarsky, 86, American football player (Washington Redskins, New York Giants) and coach (Minnesota Vikings).
