= Trevor Brown =

Trevor Brown can refer to:

- Trevor Brown (artist) (born 1959), English artist
- Trevor Brown (baseball) (born 1991), American baseball player
- Trevor Brown (cricketer, born 1933) (1933–2014), South African cricketer
- Trevor Brown (cricketer, born 1940) (born 1940), South African cricketer
- Trevor Brown (table tennis) (born 1979), Australian table tennis player
