= Hearron =

Hearron is a surname. Notable people with the surname include:

- Brandon Hearron, American soccer player on the All-time Bakersfield Brigade roster
- J. R. Hearron, first full-time pastor in Dixie Inn, Louisiana
- Jeff Hearron (born 1961), American baseball catcher
- Martha S. Hearron (1943–2014), American statistician
