= Ernest Johnson =

Ernest Johnson may refer to:

- Ernest Johnson (cyclist) (1912–1997), British Olympic track cyclist
- Ernest W. Johnson (1924–2014), American physiatrist and electromyographer
- Ernest Lee Johnson (1960–2021), American convicted criminal executed in Missouri
- Ernest Leonard Johnson (1891–1977), South African astronomer
- Ernest Johnson (American football) (1921–1985), American football coach
- Ernest Norman Johnson (1915–2015), American politician in North Dakota
- Ernest A. Johnson (1895–1959), professor of economics and president of Lake Forest College

== See also ==
- Moose Johnson (Thomas Ernest Johnson, 1886–1963), Canadian ice hockey defenceman
- Earnest Johnson (1952–2024), American politician, member of the Alabama House of Representatives
- Ernie Johnson (disambiguation)
