= Hans Villius =

Swedish historian (1923–2012)

Hans E. Villius
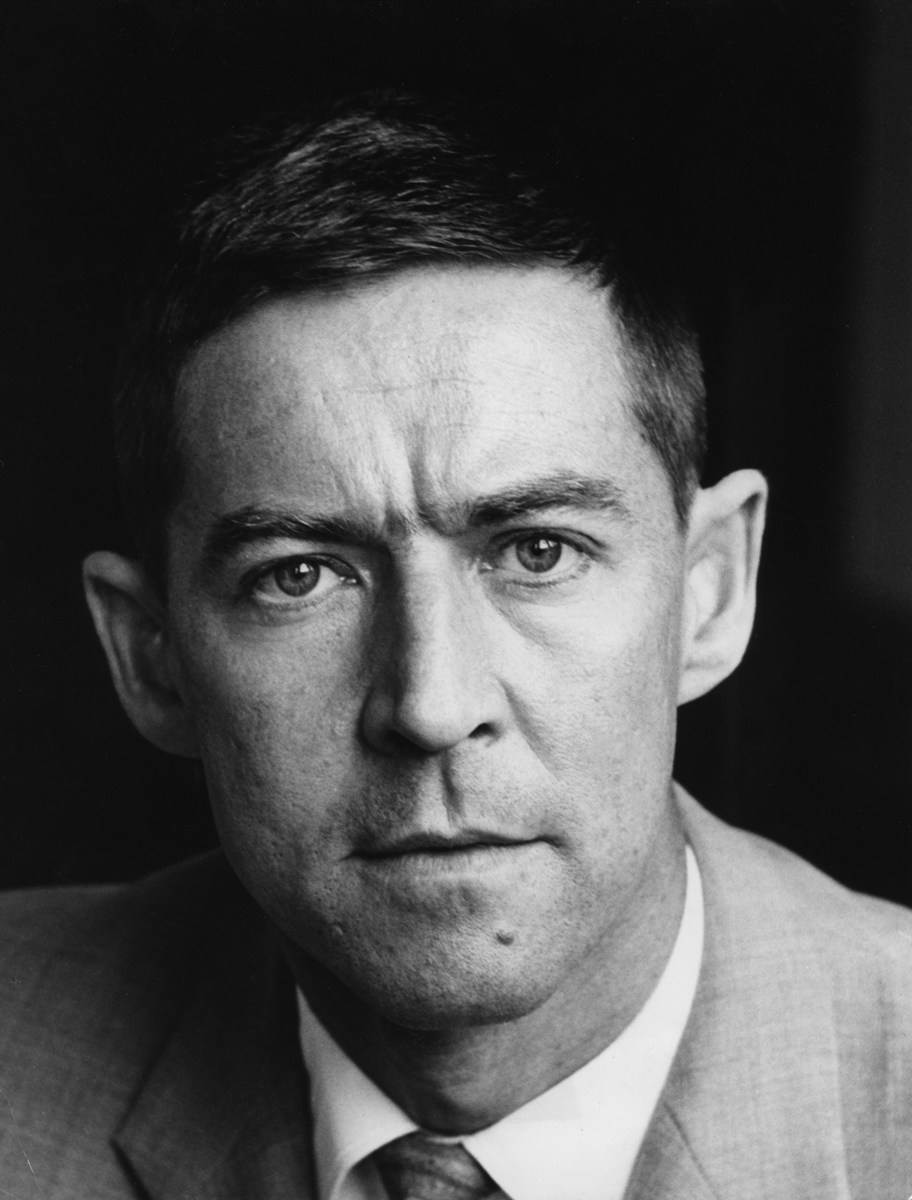
- Hans Villius in 1964
- Born: 10 July 1923; Kalmar, Sweden
- Died: 22 June 2012 (aged 88); Täby, Sweden
- Education: Lund University; Licentiate of Philosophy (1948); Doctor of Philosophy (1951)
- Occupations: Docent at Lund University (1952–1957); Sveriges Radio (1957–1966); Head of the cultural editorial (1963–1966); Sveriges Television (1966–1996); Manager of the documentary history section (1966–?); TV2 (1969–1987); Kanal 1 (1987–1996); Also: Writer, historian and documentary filmmaker
- Known for: Narration
- Title: Doctor of Philosophy (1951); Title of Professor (Swedish: Professors namn) (1996)
- Spouse: Elsa Villius (1952–2012)
- Relatives: Gertrud Zetterholm, sister.; Sara Villius, granddaughter.; Finn Zetterholm, nephew.
- Awards: H. M. The King's Medal of the 8th size (2012); Royal Order of the Seraphim's Ribbon (2012)

Hans Emil Villius (10 July 1923 – 22 June 2012) was a Swedish historian and popular TV and radio personality.

Villius received his doctorate in history in 1951 with his dissertation Karl XII:s ryska fälttåg: Källstudier ("Charles XII's Russian campaign: A Source Study.") in which he critically analysed the narrative sources of Charles XII's officers during the campaign. In 1957 Villius joined Swedish Radiotjänst (now Sveriges Radio), Sweden's national public radio corporation, and began making popular historical documentaries and programming until he moved to Sveriges Television (SVT) in 1966. It was at SVT that Villius began working with TV-producer Olle Häger, a very productive collaboration that would span some two decades. During the 1980s and 1990s, Häger and Villius produced several popular documentaries like Fyra dagar som skakade Sverige ("Four days that shook Sweden") in 1988 about the Swedish "Midsummer crisis" during World War II and Raoul Wallenberg - fånge i Sovjet ("Raoul Wallenberg - prisoner in the Soviet Union.") as well as one of SVT's biggest and most popular documentary productions ever, Hundra Svenska År ("One Hundred Swedish years"), consisting of eight one-hour documentaries on the history of Sweden during the 20th century from many different perspectives.

== Bibliography ==
- Karl XII:s ryska fälttåg : källstudier (1951)
- Glimtar från det gamla Malm (1955)
- Kassettbrevens gåta : Maria Stuart och mordet på * Darnley (1956)
- Makten, äran och helvetet : ögonblicksbilder ur modern och äldre historia (1959)
- Rättegångar som skakat världen (1961)
- Ryktbara rättegångar (1962)
- Åsyna vittne : ögonvittnen berättar om dramatiska händelser i historien (1990)
- Sex dagböcker från fem sekler (1992)
- Åsyna vittne 2 : ögonvittnen berättar om den första månlandningen och andra dramatiska händelser i historien (1995)

with Olle Häger

- Det bortförlovade landet : krig och kris i Mellanöstern (1970)
- Stalin : porträtt av en diktator (1970)
- Rebellernas rike : Cuba och Castros revolution (1970)
- Högt spel i tändstickor : Ivar Kreuger och hans värld (1970)
- Solen går upp i väst: vätebombens historia (1970)
- Skotten i Dallas : mordet på president Kennedy (1971)
- Brännpunkt Prag : Tjeckoslovakiens dramatiska historia 1918-1968 (1971)
- Nu är det snart slut på hela härligheten : ryska revolutionen (1971)
- Ett spel om en väg som till himla bar : raketforskningens historia (1971)
- In i det kalla kriget : Sverige mellan stormakterna 1946-1952 (1971)
- Rök : gåtornas sten (1976)
- Ett satans år : Norrland 1867 (1978)
- 1000 år : en svensk historia (1980)
- Svart på vitt (1990)

with Elsa Villius

- You, the jury : a trial of Mary, Queen of Scots, for complicity in the murder of her husband, Lord Darnley (1962)
- Fallet Raoul Wallenberg (1966)

== Discography ==
- Det mest formidabla klot jag någonsin skådat (1996)
- Skrivet i lönndom (1999)
- Svart gryning (2000)
