= Gordon Curran Stewart =

American film director

Gordon Stewart
- Born: Gordon Curran Stewart; July 22, 1939; Chicago, Illinois, U.S.
- Died: November 26, 2014 (aged 75); Garrison, New York, U.S.
- Education: University of Chicago Laboratory Schools, Oberlin College of Arts and Sciences, University of Chicago, University of Vienna, Yale School of Drama
- Occupation(s): Vice Chairman of the International Insurance Society, Publisher of the Philipstown Dot Info Newspaper, Founder of The Next Deal, Inc.
- Known for: Deputy Chief Speechwriter to President Carter 1978–1981, Vice President of American Stock Exchange 1982–1989, President of Insurance Information Institute 1991–2006, North American Liaison for The Geneva Association 1995–2012, and Vice Chairman of the International Insurance Society 2012–present.
- Spouse: Zanne Early (1995–2014; his death)
- Children: 1

Gordon Curran Stewart (July 22, 1939 – November 26, 2014) was an American speechwriter, academic, businessman and publisher.

Stewart was:

- Deputy Chief Speechwriter to President Jimmy Carter
- President of the Insurance Information Institute
- North American Liaison for The Geneva Association
- Chairman of The Geneva Association Communications Council
- Executive for Policy and Programs to New York Mayor John Lindsay
- Head of Public Affairs for Arthur Levitt at the American Stock Exchange
- Member of the Defense Science Board

He wrote on political and economic topics for the International Association for the Study of Insurance Economics, The New York Times, U.S. News & World Report, and CNN.

== Early life ==
Stewart was born in Chicago in 1939 to Henry Stewart and Evangeline (née Williams) Stewart. His father was born in Scotland and emigrated to the United States at the age of 26, where he became a Presbyterian minister and social worker/organizer in the Chicago neighborhoods. Stewart's mother, Evangeline, worked as a University of Chicago librarian, and this, coupled with the help of a scholarship, allowed Stewart to enter the University of Chicago Laboratory Schools, where he remained into his high school years and where he was student body president.

== Education ==
Stewart received his Bachelor of Arts degree from the Oberlin College of Arts and Sciences (as the full four-year George F. Baker Scholar having been accepted at the age of 16), where he focused on history and music. He returned to the University of Chicago to work on a PhD. in European History. He studied music and drama at the University of Vienna in Austria, and then received an MFA in Directing from Yale School of Drama. In his last year at the Yale School of Drama, he was admitted as a doctoral candidate in comparative literature, which led to his first position as an instructor of English and theatre at Amherst College.

== Career ==
=== Pre-White House ===
Stewart's first political job was as a ten-year-old poll-watcher in Chicago's 5th Ward which staunchly but futilely opposed the political machine of Richard J. Daley. His next was at the University of Chicago Laboratory Schools where he was student body president. As a student at Oberlin College, he won its only all-school election, and spent several months traveling in and writing about West Africa in the days before the Peace Corps was founded. He left teaching at Amherst College to begin a career in drama and politics in New York. While he was directing plays, he worked as Director of Communications for Business Communications for the Arts. There he wrote his first article for a noted public figure, former US Treasury Secretary C. Douglas Dillon, followed by speeches for Katharine Graham of The Washington Post, William S. Paley of CBS, and Arnold Gingrich, the founder of Esquire Magazine, who introduced him to New York Mayor John Lindsay, which led to his position as Chief Speechwriter and Executive Assistant to the Mayor from 1971 to 1973.

Following his time in City Hall, Stewart was Director of Policy for Howard J. Samuels's run for the Governorship of New York in 1974, and also wrote speeches for other Democratic Party campaigns, including Jimmy Carter's successful run for the Presidency of the United States in 1976. During this time, Stewart also wrote and directed theatre in New York and London.

He worked as a screenwriter in Los Angeles, where he became a lifelong friend of Philip Ives Dunne, the first screenwriter to receive a star on the Hollywood Walk of Fame, and a strong and vocal opponent of the Hollywood Blacklisting of the 1950s. Stewart gave the dedication speech for the Writer's Guild Theatre when it was named in Dunne's honor.

In Hollywood, Stewart was asked to direct The Elephant Man in its Broadway debut in New York. Soon after, he was appointed Deputy Chief Speechwriter to President Carter.

=== White House ===
Carter's Chief Speechwriter Hendrik Hertzberg invited Stewart to join the White House in 1978 as the President's Deputy Chief Speechwriter. Stewart collaborated with Hertzberg on virtually all the major speeches of the Carter Presidency from 1978 onwards, including the landmark presidential address, the Oval Office "Crisis of Confidence" talk of July 15, 1979.

Stewart was directly involved in multiple Presidential projects including the Strategic Arms Limitation Talks (SALT II), energy, fiscal and monetary policy, human rights issues, the response to the Soviet invasion of Afghanistan, the first visit to the White House by a Pope in United States history by Pope John Paul II in 1979, three State of the Union addresses, and the farewell speech of President Carter to the nation.

=== Post White House ===
Following his time in the White House, Stewart continued his work in politics as a director of the New York Urban Coalition, and as an advisor to various business, government, and academic forums including the Committee for a Responsible Federal Budget, the National Bureau of Economic Research, the American Business Conference in Washington DC the International Commission for Central American Recovery and Development, the Council on Competitiveness, and the Defence Science Board.

=== American Stock Exchange ===
From 1982 to 1989, Stewart served as Vice President of the American Stock Exchange under Arthur Levitt Jr. Responsible for the external affairs of the Exchange, Stewart created with President Reagan's Pollster, Richard Wirthlin, an influential polling base on Wall Street.

Stewart helped to manage a task force created by then New York Governor Mario Cuomo and then New York Mayor David Norman Dinkins that resolved the multiyear impasse about what to do with $7,000,000,000 of federal highway money left over when the Westway Project was halted.

=== Insurance Information Institute ===
Stewart joined the Insurance Information Institute in 1989 as Executive Vice President, and in 1991 became its president and remained in that position until 2006, when he turned the institute's leadership over to its Chief Economist, Dr. Robert P. Hartwig.

An important goal for Stewart in re-building the institute was to persuade insurance companies that their reputation is ultimately determined by their market place activities and policies. From the time Stewart took over the institute, the overall public approval rating of the industry rose from under 35% to above 60%.

=== Post-Insurance Information Institute ===
In 1995, Stewart was invited by the industry-CEO membership of the Switzerland-based think-tank, The Geneva Association for the Study of Insurance Economics, to chair the Geneva Association's first Communications Council, and to later become the North American Liaison in charge of managing The Geneva Association's presence in the United States.

=== Philipstown Dot Info ===
In 2010, Stewart created an online newspaper Philipstown Dot Info. The paper's purpose is to create a working model for community-supported journalism similar to listener-supported radio that can be replicated in municipalities all across the country. The launch of the paper followed the buyout and redirection of the pre-existing and longstanding local newspaper by Roger Ailes, Chairman of Fox News.

Philipstown Dot Info received a 2011 Standard of Excellence Award from the New Media Foundation. In 2012, Philipstown Dot Info introduced its weekly print publication, called "The Paper".

On March 21, 2013, Stewart was awarded Outstanding Business Person of the Year by the Cold Spring, New York Chamber of Commerce.

In September, 2009, Stewart was asked by The New York Times to write a response to President Obama's First Inauguration. In September 2012, Stewart was asked by CNN to write a response to Michelle Obama's speech to the Democratic National Convention. In February 2013, Stewart was asked by CNN to write a response to President Obama's second inaugural address.

=== International Insurance Industry Century of "Game Changers" ===
In 2013, Stewart was named by the Council of Insurance Agents & Brokers, an association for commercial insurance intermediaries, as one of the international insurance industry's of the last 100 years – Stewart was recognized for his work with the Insurance Information Institute.

== Memberships ==
Stewart was a longstanding Member of the Writers Guild of America, the Judson Welliver Society of Senior Presidential Speechwriters (for which he acted as Secretary since its founding by William Safire during President Reagan's first Administration), the Council on Foreign Relations, the Century Association, the Phi Beta Kappa Society, and the Yale Club.

== Death ==
Stewart died on November 26, 2014, aged 75. He had suffered from emphysema.

== Selection of Creative Works ==
=== Screenwriter ===
- The Store (1978)
- Joey (1978)
- Gallery (1978)

=== Theatre director ===
- The Elephant Man (U.S. debut, 1977)
- Jesse (1975)
- Cowboy Mouth (1976)
- Sleep (1977)

=== Film director ===
- The Blazers (1975)

=== Music conductor ===
- The Messiah (2013)
- Beggar's Opera (1969, 2012)
- West Side Story (1970)

== Personal life ==
Stewart married Zanne Early in 1995; they had one child, a daughter, Katarina.
