= Ernie Johnson =

Ernie Johnson may refer to:

- Moose Johnson (Thomas Ernest Johnson, 1886–1963), Canadian ice hockey defenceman
- Ernie Johnson (shortstop) (1888–1952), American baseball shortstop
- Ernie Johnson (pitcher) (1924–2011), American baseball pitcher and sportscaster
- Ernie Johnson (American football) (1926–2010), American college athlete at UCLA
- Ernie Johnson (jockey) (born 1948), British flat racing jockey
- Ernie Johnson Jr. (born 1956), American sportscaster, son of the pitcher
- Ernie Johnson, a BBC soap opera character on EastEnders

== See also ==
- Ernest Johnson (disambiguation)
