= Grover C. Richardson =

American politician from Arkansas (1948–2014)

Grover Cleveland Richardson Jr. (September 9, 1948 – November 12, 2014) was a state legislator in Arkansas.

He was one of the representatives for Pulaski County, Arkansas. He served in the Arkansas House of Representatives from 1977 to 1984. In 1983 he sponsored a bill to require executions be broadcast live.

According to his obituary, he graduated in 1966 from Horace Mann Sr. High School in Little Rock, received a B.S. degree in business administration from Southern University in Baton Rouge, Louisiana in 1971 where he played football, and attended Southwestern Graduate School of Banking at Southern Methodist University in Dallas, Texas. He worked at Worthern Bank and Trust in Little Rock and as a tax and business consultant. He served four terms in the Arkansas legislature.

He had three sons with wife Brenda Faulkner Richardson.
