= Insurance Information Institute =

I.I.I. – Insurance Information Institute
- Abbreviation: I.I.I.
- Formation: 1959 (67 years ago)
- Type: Industry association
- Legal status: Nonprofit organization (since 1989)
- Purpose: To improve public understanding of insurance
- Location: New York, NY
- President and Chief Executive Officer: Sean Kevelighan
- Revenue: $9,545,189 (2015)
- Expenses: $8,406,962 (2015)
- Website: iii.org

The Insurance Information Institute (I.I.I.) is a U.S. industry association which exists "to improve public understanding of insurance – what it does and how it works." Founded in 1959, the organization is based in New York City. Since 1989 the I.I.I. has held 501(c)(6) tax-exempt status (defined as business leagues, chambers of commerce, boards of trade, and the like).

The I.I.I. web site provides information for consumers, the media, researchers and the general public on a wide range of topics, including automobile insurance, homeowner's insurance, life insurance, annuities, health insurance, long-term care insurance and disability insurance. The Web site also contains papers, presentations and factsheets that focus on financial results, disasters, climate change, and other key issues the insurance industry faces. In addition, a number of publications are published, including the Insurance Fact Book, the Financial Services Fact Book, Insuring Your Business, the Insurance Handbook and a wide variety of brochures, including "12 Ways to Lower Your Homeowners Insurance Costs".

The institute's current president and chief executive officer, Sean Kevelighan, assumed the post in August 2016. Kevelighan succeeded Robert Hartwig, who had led I.I.I. since 2007; Hartwig left in order to become a faculty member in the University of South Carolina's Darla Moore School of Business, and director of the school's Risk and Uncertainty Management Center.
