= Wycliffe Kiyingi =

- Born: Wycliffe Kiyingi; 1929; Uganda
- Died: 15 November 2014 (aged 84–85)
- Education: King's College Budo
- Occupation: Playwright
- Writing career
- Notable work: Gwosussa emmwanyi

Wycliffe Kiyingi (1929 – 15 November 2014) was a Ugandan playwright whose plays influenced the free travelling theatre at Makerere University in the mid-1960s. He was the first Ugandan to stage a play at the National Theatre in 1953, with his play Pio Mbereenge Kamulaali — the first in a Ugandan native language to be staged at the National Theatre. Kiyingi formed the country’s first theatre group to comprise native Ugandans; The African Artistes Association.The group adopted the mode of a travelling theatre, taking its productions to different parts of Buganda. It is from there that other theatre groups (such as the Makerere Free Travelling Theatre of the 1960s) got inspiration, leading to the development of a fully-fledged local theatre movement in the country. He was also the pioneer Ugandan national to write radio and TV drama in Uganda in the late 1950s.

== Early life and education ==
Kiyingi was born to Ernest Kaggwe in 1929. He went to King's College Buddo. During pre-independence Uganda, colonial governor Andrew Cohen granted him a scholarship to study drama at Bristol University from where he would further polish his skills at Oxford University in London.

== Writing ==
He wrote more than ten books that have been widely translated and many directed into plays and others adapted into both the secondary and university syllabi. Some of his plays (in Luganda) include; Gwosussa Emmwanyi, Lozio Bba Ssesiriya, Olugendo lw'e Gologoosa, Muduuma Kwe Kwaffe, Ssempala bba mukyala Ssempala and the radio play Wókulira, which ran on the then Radio Uganda for close to two decades.

== Published works ==
- Gwosussa emmwanyi. Macmillan. 1966.

== Plays ==
- Sempala Bba Mukyala Sempala
- W’okulira
- Gw’osussa Emmwanyi
- Olugendo lw’e Gologoosa
- Omwana w’Omuntu, 1969
- Muduuma Kwe Kwaffe
- Pio Mberenge Kaamulali

== Awards and recognition ==
- Recognized with a Golden Artiste (1954–2009) award by Uganda National Cultural Centre, 2009
- Golden Drama Award for the most Prolific Multimedia Playwright, from the Golden Drama Foundation, 2007
