= James D. Mockler =

American politician (1939–2014)

Member of the Wyoming House of Representatives
- In office 1973–1976

Personal details
- Born: March 9, 1939 Lander, Wyoming, U.S.
- Died: November 24, 2014 (aged 75) Helena, Montana, U.S.
- Party: Republican
- Spouse: Colleen Mockler
- Children: 3
- Education: University of Wyoming

James D. Mockler (March 9, 1939 – November 24, 2014) was an American politician. He served as a Republican member of the Wyoming House of Representatives.

== Life and career ==
Mockler was born in Lander, Wyoming, the son of Esther and Frank Mockler. He attended Dubois High School, Schattuck Military School, Laramie High School and the University of Wyoming. He became a real estate agent, opening up his own business Mockler Land and Realty.

In 1973, Mockler was elected to the Wyoming House of Representatives, representing Big Horn County, Wyoming. In 1974 he urged Harry Leimback to resign from his senatorial seat when he was running for governor as Leimback viewed it as a "virtual cinch" and was blocking the election of a new senator for Natrona County. He served until 1976 and moved to Helena and was executive director of the Montana Coal Council.

Mockler died in November 2014, at the age of 75, in Helena, Montana and the James D. Mockler memorial Fund was established to help young people to learn a trade.
