= Michael Shanahan (journalist) =

American journalist (1943–2014)

- Born: June 29, 1943; Washington, D.C., U.S.
- Died: November 22, 2014 (aged 71)
- Education: Pennsylvania State University (B.A., 1965)
- Occupation: Journalist
- Known for: Reporting on 1970 Kent State shootings

Michael Shanahan (June 29, 1943 – November 22, 2014) was an American journalist for the Associated Press. His reporting included the 1970 shootings at a demonstration at Kent State University in Ohio. He would later go on to become a professor of journalism at the George Washington University for more than two decades.

== Early life and career ==
Joseph Michael Shanahan was born June 29, 1943, in Washington and grew up in Bangor, Pa. He received his B.A. in 1965 from the Pennsylvania State University in journalism. Shanahan joined the AP in 1965, but left shortly thereafter to serve in the Vietnam War as a U.S. Army intelligence officer where he was awarded the Bronze Star and a Combat Infantryman's Badge. After returning from the war, Shanahan worked for the AP at their Pittsburgh bureau covering events that included the 1970 shootings at a demonstration at Kent State University in Ohio, and the assassination of United Mine Workers of America leader Jock Yablonski. He moved shortly thereafter to the AP’s Washington bureau where he covered topics that included presidential campaigns and the work of the executive and legislative branches.

== Later life and teaching career ==
Shanahan began teaching at the George Washington University as an adjunct professor in 1999. He later became an assistant professor in 2005, and assistant director for student affairs at the School of Media and Public Affairs. Shanahan taught subjects that included Washington reporting and journalistic ethics, and he advised the student newspaper, The GW Hatchet. He would become one of the longest-serving members of the newspaper’s Board of Directors, having joined in 2000. "Michael Shanahan brought a reporter's eye and a professor's dedication to his work," said Frank Sesno, director of the School of Media and Public Affairs. “Through his teaching, advising and mentoring, his commitment was always to students first. In his classes and through the internships he managed, Professor Shanahan pushed students to be better journalists, writers, reporters and citizens."
