= René Abeliuk =

Chilean lawyer

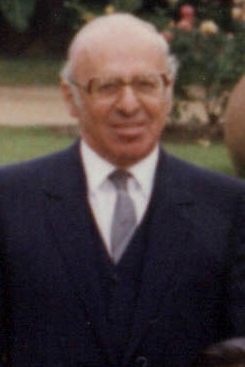
- René Abeliuk in 1990

Executive Vice President of the Chilean Production Development Corporation
- In office 11 March 1990 – 11 March 1994
- President: Patricio Aylwin
- Preceded by: Guillermo Letelier Skinner
- Succeeded by: Felipe Sandoval Precht

Personal details
- Born: René Abeliuk Manasevich; 14 February 1931 Santiago, Chile
- Died: 19 November 2014 (aged 83) Santiago, Chile
- Party: Radical Party of Chile (1948–1971); Chilean Social Democracy Party; Party for Democracy
- Spouse: María Olga Rojas Besoaín
- Children: 2
- Education: University of Chile
- Occupation: Lawyer; academic; politician

René Abeliuk Manasevich (14 February 1931 – 19 November 2014) was a Chilean lawyer, academic and politician. One of the key opposition leaders against the Pinochet dictatorship, Abeliuk served as Minister of State and executive vice-president of CORFO during the first democratic administration of President Patricio Aylwin.

== Early life ==
René Abeliuk Manasevich was born on 14 February 1931 in Santiago, Chile, to Jewish immigrants from Odesa who moved to Chile in the beginning of the 20th century.

Abeliuk attended the Instituto Nacional General José Miguel Carrera in Santiago and studied law at Universidad de Chile. Upon becoming a lawyer, he worked with famed Chilean jurist Manuel Somarriva and specialized in civil law.

== Political career ==
Abeliuk entered politics in 1948, joining the Radical Party of Chile.

On 3 August 1971 Abeliuk, with several of his colleagues, left the Radical Party and founded the Party of the Radical Left (PIR). In 1972 he served as secretary of the Federation of Democratic Opposition, a coalition of the PIR, the Christian Democratic Party and the National Democratic Party. This coalition later became the Confederation of Democracy, in which Abeliuk served as vice president.

Between 1973 and 1980, during the regime of Augusto Pinochet, Abeliuk held high ranking positions within the Chilean Social Democracy Party — the successor to the PIR — and later left to join the Party for Democracy, founded to oppose the dictatorship. Between 1983 and 1986 he served on the executive committee of the opposition Democratic Alliance.

In the mid 1980s, Abeliuk was one of the main promoters and signatories of the National Agreement for a Transition to Full Democracy, a plan promoted by the Archbishop of Santiago, Juan Francisco Fresno.

When Patricio Aylwin was elected president in 1990, he designated Abeliuk as Executive Vice President of Corporación de Fomento de la Producción (Corfo), where he served until the end of Aylwin's first term in 1994.

== Later life ==
After his time in government, Abeliuk returned to practicing law. Between 2003 and 2006, Abeliuk served as an appellate attorney for the Supreme Court of Chile. He wrote several legal articles and books, as well as columns for El Mercurio and Las Últimas Noticias.

== Personal life ==
Abeliuk was married to María Olga Rojas Besoaín, an educator at the University of Chile and later a judge of the Eighth Criminal Court of Santiago. Together Abeliuk and Rojas had two children.

Abeliuk died of cancer on 19 November 2014 in Santiago.
