= Dennis Elwell (astrologer) =

British astrologer (1930–2014)

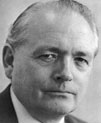
- Born: 16 February 1930; Stourbridge, Worcestershire, England
- Died: 13 November 2014 (aged 84); Stourbridge, Worcestershire, England
- Occupations: Astrologer; journalist; author; lecturer

Dennis Elwell (16 February 1930 – 13 November 2014) was a British astrologer, journalist, author and lecturer. He is the author of the book Cosmic Loom, and has contributed articles to the publications The Future of Astrology, the Astrological Association Journal, American Astrology, Prediction and Mountain Astrologer.

== Early life ==
He was born in Stourbridge, Worcestershire in 1930. As a teenager, Elwell taught himself the basics of astrology.

== Career ==
At the age of 19, he had an article on reincarnation published in the magazine Prediction. In 1953, he began writing regularly for American Astrology, a popular magazine that acted as a platform for contemporary astrologers. His association with the magazine continued for twenty years.

Elwell was a professional journalist for most of his life. At the same time, he explored astrological theory, following diversified interests in science and the works of occultists such as Rudolf Steiner and George Gurdjieff. He began lecturing to astrologers in 1963 and gained a reputation for being an original thinker and stimulating speaker.

Elwell's articles and lectures led to wider recognition. He was a guest lecturer at the 1981, 1984 and 1987 astrology World Congresses in Switzerland, the 1983 and 1984 international congresses in Berkeley, California, and the 1986 Berlin International Congress. His lectures have been translated into German and Dutch.

He gave the Charles Carter Memorial Lecture for the Astrological Association of Great Britain in 1974 and 1992, and in 2007 was awarded the Charles Harvey Award for Exceptional Service to Astrology by the Astrological Association of Great Britain.

== Death ==
He died in Stourbridge on 13 November 2014.

== Cosmic Loom ==
Elwell's prime work is Cosmic Loom, a recommended text amongst astrologers.

The text has passed through four editions:

1. hardback (Unwin Hyman, 1987)
2. paperback reprint (HarperCollins/Thorsons, 1988)
3. revised and enlarged paperback (Urania Trust, 2000)
4. paperback (Wessex Astrologer, 2008)

In 1987, Elwell's predictions on a heightened risk to shipping formed part of a publicity campaign for the book. He said that his publisher requested the forecasts to draw attention to astrology.

Press attention followed for the rest of the year:

One journalist wanted to know what else the sage could see, so I said that in the autumn I was worried about disasters on underground transport,...The morning after the terrible King's Cross fire the regional evening paper, the Express and Star, rang to ask if I recalled the interview I had given them, in which I had cautioned about such a tragedy, and they carried a report to that effect alongside their front-page story.

== Predictions ==
Elwell said, in his own account, that in 1987 he forewarned two shipping companies of trouble, one of these being the British ferry company P&O Ferries. Less than two weeks after P&O replied to Elwell, to reassure him that their procedures were designed "to deal with the unexpected from whatever quarter", their ship, the Herald of Free Enterprise, capsized at the Belgian port of Bruges-Zeebrugge with the loss of 188 lives.

The editorial lead to Elwell's account read:

In 1987 Dennis Elwell attracted considerable attention in the UK press. Within days of forewarning two British shipping companies of potential trouble at sea, one of them met serious misfortune with the loss of the Herald of Free Enterprise. Elwell's attention to the prospect of shipping disaster was prompted by the March 1987 solar eclipse in Pisces.

Elwell said that the correspondence was examined by journalists, after which a number of newspapers carried the story of the "warning ignored". This was followed by an appearance on the BBC's Kilroy TV show, and further press attention later the same year. Elwell's correspondence with P&O was also reported in the Channel 4 documentary series Witness in June 2000, in a programme examining the rise in the influence of astrology.

== Criticism ==
Amongst the astrological community some reporters of the Herald of Free Enterprise event have been critical, arguing that such predictions lack specific information, and are unable to be replicated in a situation that would be of value to anyone.

Leading sceptics, such as James Randi and Geoffrey Dean, have been critical of Elwell, engaging in public exchanges concerning the legitimacy and value of astrology in science. Suitbert Ertel was also frequently locked in such arguments with Elwell, and was to write critically of him:

Dennis Elwell, despite being well informed, ignores all this research. He refers to a no-authority in statistical matters, Dawkins, who has published nothing in this field. Further, he ignores most favourable judgments on Gauquelin research by H.J. Eysenck, whose score of published statistical studies in mainstream psychology has hardly been excelled by anyone. For me, therefore, the way Elwell uses his intellectual capacity to downgrade scientific research on Gauquelin effects is utterly irresponsible.
