= Sharad Thakre =

Indian cricketer (1968–2014)

Personal information
- Born: 7 September 1968; Nagpur, India
- Died: 20 November 2014 (aged 46); Nagpur, India
- Source: Cricinfo, 1 April 2016

Sharad Thakre (7 September 1968 – 20 November 2014) was an Indian cricketer. He played two first-class matches for Vidarbha in 1993/94.
