= Kazuko Hara =

Japanese composer

Kazuko Hara (原 嘉壽子 (Note: Her name was originally written 原 和子, which has the same pronunciation.), Hara Kazuko; 10 February 1935 – 30 November 2014) was a prolific Japanese opera composer.

== Life and career ==
Born in Tokyo, Kazuko Hara studied at the Tokyo National University of Fine Arts and Music with Tomojiro Ikenouchi, graduating in 1957. She subsequently went to France where she studied with Henri Dutilleux at the Ecole Normale and Alexander Tcherepnin at L'Academie Internationale d'Ete in Nice. She then traveled to Venice, where she studied vocal performance with I.A. Corradetti at the Venice Conservatory, from which she graduated in 1963. Hara then returned to Japan, where she studied Gregorian Chant, eventually becoming an instructor at the Osaka University of Music (1968-85).

She died of heart failure on 30 November 2014.

== Works and compositional style ==
Between 1978 and 1999 she wrote 18 operas, many of them performed in Tokyo by the Nihon Opera Kyokai or the Nikikai Opera. One work was performed in Italy. In general, she has preferred Japanese subjects; exceptions include her second opera about Sherlock Holmes and an opera based on Dostoevsky's Crime and Punishment written for a large-scale production at the New National Theatre, Tokyo in 1999.

=== Operas ===
- Shārokku Hōmuzu no jikenbo: kokuhaku (The Case-book of Sherlock Holmes: the Confession) after Conan Doyle (1981)
- Iwai Uta ga Nagareru Yoruni (1984)
- Shita wo Kamikitta Onna (1986)
- Sute Hime (1989)
- Yosakoi Bushi (1990)
- Petro Kibe (1991)
- Tsumi to batsu (Crime and Punishment) after Dostoevsky (1999)

=== Other works ===
- Sonatine for piano (1957)
- Preludio, aria e toccata for guitar (1970)

== Recordings ==
- Yosakoi Bushi has been recorded and published on Laserdisc.

• 'Daniel Quinn performs Guitar music by Japanese composers'. This recording includes Kazuhiro Hara's Prelude Aria and Toccata for guitar solo.

== Sources ==
- Holledge, Simon. "Hara Kazuko: Crime and Punishment, 19th June 1999", Opera Japonica
- Kanazawa, Masakata (2001). "Hara, Kazuko". In Sadie, Stanley; Tyrrell, John (eds.). The New Grove Dictionary of Music and Musicians (2nd ed.). London: Macmillan Publishers. ISBN 978-1-56159-239-5.
- Biographical note for Daniel Quinn recital, accessed 20 January 2010
