= Beatrice Bruteau =

American philosopher, contemplative and author

Beatrice Bruteau (1930–2014) was an American contemplative, philosopher and author.

== Early life and education ==
Beatrice Bruteau was born on July 25, 1930, in Evanston, Illinois. According to her obituary, her parents were Frederick and Ruth Folgerstrum Bruteau, and she was raised in Jefferson City, Missouri. She was one of the first women to study philosophy at the graduate level at Fordham University, where she earned a Ph.D. in philosophy in 1954.

== Career ==
Bruteau was a pioneer in interspirituality and contemplative thinking. Her work bridged the boundaries of traditional academic disciplines, as she brought diverse subjects, such as science, mathematics, philosophy, religion, into conversation with one another. In her work, she explored mystical, contemplative and philosophical texts from multiple religious traditions, particularly within Buddhism, Christianity and Hinduism.

In addition to numerous articles, Bruteau authored or edited twelve books. Amongst these was Radical Optimism: Rooting Ourselves in Reality, which was published in 1993; a second edition was published in 2002. in Radical Optimism, Bruteau suggests that by engaging in contemplative practices, we come to know ourselves more authentically, recenter spiritual values in our lives, and find more optimism about the world. Bruteau compiled a collection of essays about Benedictine monk, Bede Griffiths, who lived in India and was innovative in his integration of Hindu and Christian views. The book, The Other Half of my Soul, was published in 1996, and the Dalai Lama wrote the foreword. In 1999, she published God's Ecstasy: The Creation of a Self-Creating World, which looks at ways that science and a scientific understanding of the natural world can inform spirituality.

Bruteau also served as a co-editor and contributor to the journal, American Vedantist, from 1995 to 2007, and was managing editor of the International Philosophical Quarterly, a publication she co-founded with her husband, James Somerville, a professor of philosophy at Fordham. Together, they co-founded of Schola Contemplatonis, a network of contemplatives.

== Death and legacy ==
Bruteau had Alzheimer's disease at the end of her life. She died on November 16, 2014, at the age of 84, in Winston-Salem, North Carolina. A memorial service was held at the Knollwood Baptist Church on November 24, 2014. A collection of her papers are held at the Pitts Theological Library at Emory University in Atlanta, Georgia.

In 2016, Orbis Books released Personal Transformation and a New Creation, a collection of essays by scholars examining the writings of Bruteau and Pierre Teilhard de Chardin. The collection was edited by Ilia Delio. Cynthia Bourgeault, an Episcopal priest and colleague of Bruteau's, described her after her death as "one of the most powerful shaping influences on contemporary mystical theology, interspirituality, and contemplative practice."

== Works ==
- Bruteau. Worthy Is the World: The Hindu Philosophy of Sri Aurobindo. Associated University Press, 1972. ISBN 978-0838678725
- Bruteau. Evolution Toward Divinity: Teilhard De Chardin and the Hindu Traditions. Theosophical Publishing House, 1974. ISBN 978-0835602167
- Bruteau. The Psychic Grid: How We Create the World We Know. Quest Books (Theosophical Publishing House US), 1979. ISBN 978-0835605311
- Bruteau. Radical Optimism: Practical Spirituality in an Uncertain World. Sentient Publications. 1993, 2002. ISBN 978-1591810018
- Bruteau. What we can learn from the East. The Crossroad Publishing Company. 1995. ISBN 978-0824514570
- Bruteau, ed. The Other Half of My Soul: Bede Griffiths and the Hindu-Christian Dialogue. 1996. ISBN 978-0835607179
- Bruteau. God's Ecstasy: The Creation of a Self-Creating World. The Crossroad Publishing Company. 1997, 2016. ISBN 978-0824516833
- Bruteau, ed. Jesus Through Jewish Eyes: Rabbis And Scholars Engage An Ancient Brother In A New Conversation. 2001. ISBN 978-1570753886
- Bruteau. The Holy Thursday Revolution. Orbis Books. 2005 ISBN 978-1570755767
- Bruteau, ed. Merton & Judaism: Holiness in Words – Recognition, Repentance, and Renewal. Fons Vitae. 2003. ISBN 978-1887752558
