= Olle Häger =

Swedish journalist, television producer, writer, and historian

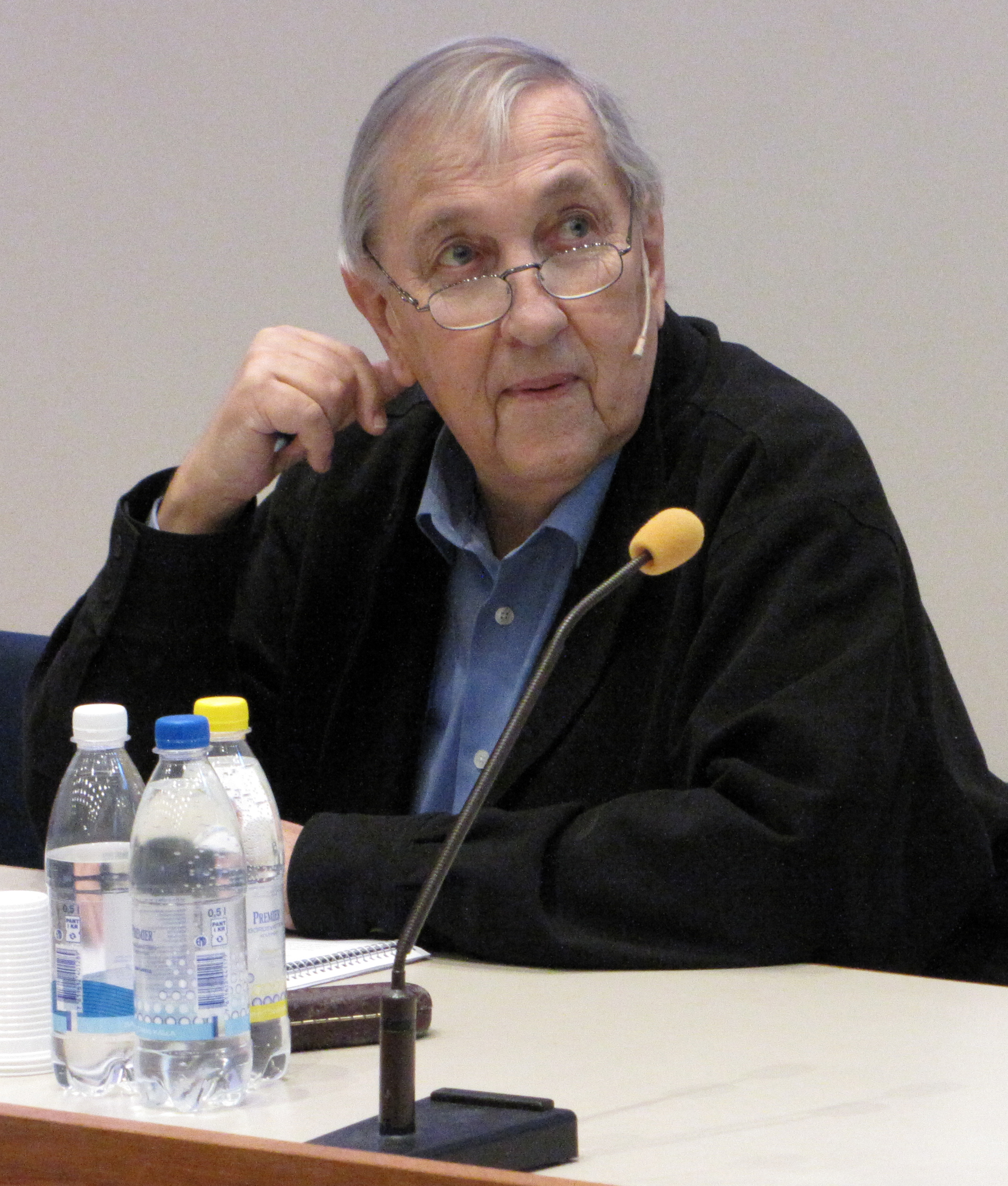
- Häger in 2012
- Born: 19 September 1935; Söderala, Hälsingland, Sweden
- Died: 1 November 2014 (aged 79); Stockholm, Sweden
- Occupations: Journalist; Television Producer
- Years active: 1964–2014
- Spouse: Ethel Häger (1958–2014; his death)

Olle Häger (19 September 1935 – 1 November 2014) was a Swedish journalist, television producer, writer and historian. Häger produced, often accompanied by historian Hans Villius, a large number of historical documentaries. In 1986, Häger and Villius were awarded the Stora Journalistpriset.
