= Dick Ivey =

Australian rules footballer

Personal information
- Full name: Richard Ivey
- Born: 15 June 1947
- Died: 22 November 2014 (aged 67)
- Original team: Pascoe Vale
- Height: 185 cm (6 ft 1 in)
- Weight: 85 kg (187 lb)

Playing career^{1}
Years	Club	Games (Goals)
1969	North Melbourne	1 (0)
1979-80	Dromana	36 (unknown)
1981	Sorrento	17 (unknown)
- ^{1} Playing statistics correct to the end of 1969.

Career highlights
- 1980 Dromana B&F

Richard Ivey (15 June 1947 – 22 November 2014) was an Australian rules footballer who played with North Melbourne in the Victorian Football League (VFL).
