= William Lonc =

Canadian physicist

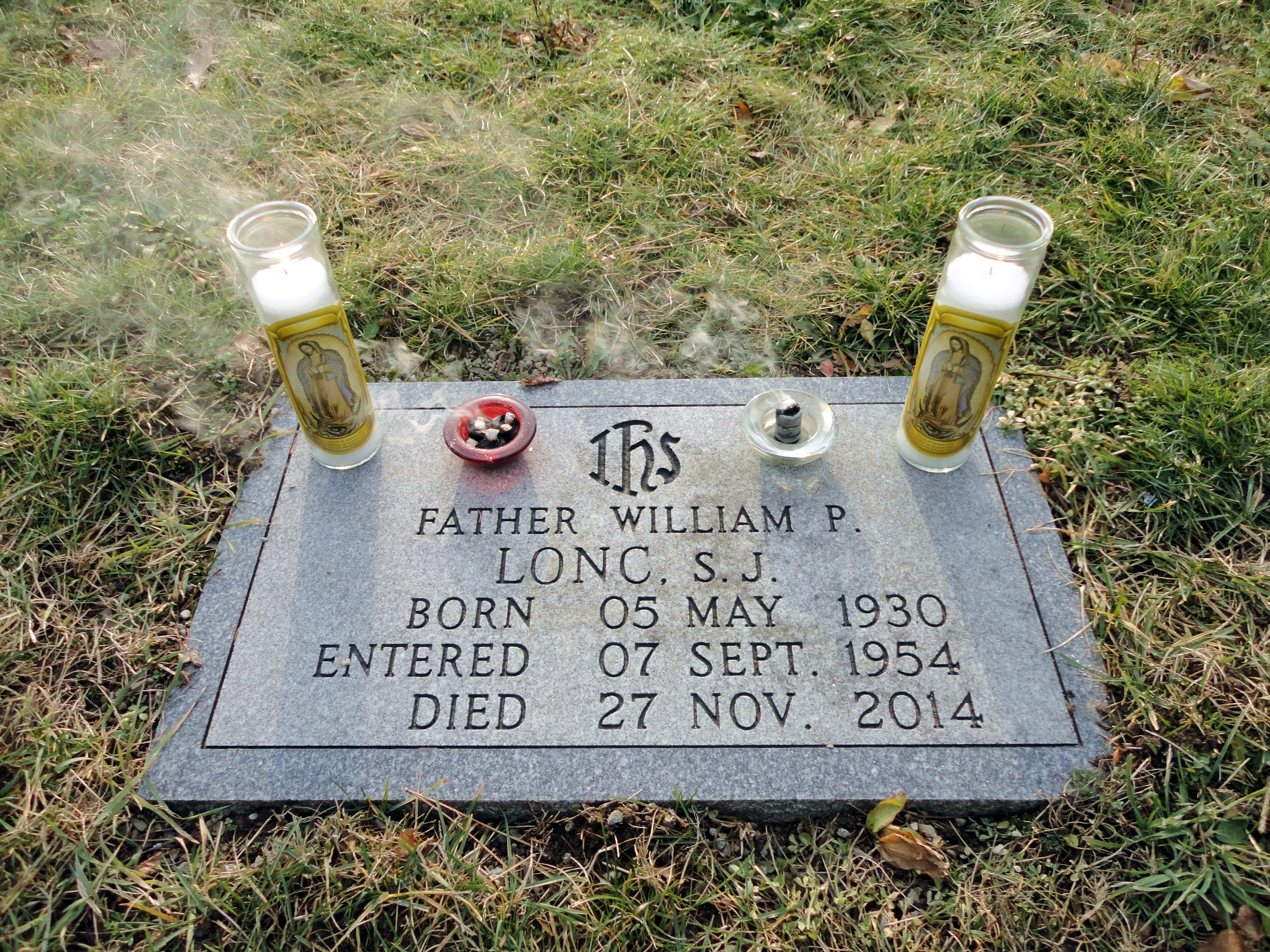
Grave marker of Rev. William P. Lonc, S.J.

William P. Lonc SJ (May 5, 1930 – November 27, 2014) was a professor emeritus of physics at Saint Mary's University in Canada and also the co-translator and co-editor of the series The Jesuit Relations, working assiduously in translating over 64 historical works by Lucien Campeau and other French Canadian Jesuit sources into English.

== Life ==
Jesuit Father William P. Lonc was born in London, Ontario, Canada on May 5, 1930, son of Gregory Lonc and Veronica Lewickie.

He studied physics at Sir George Williams University in Montreal, before he entered the Jesuit novitiate on Sept. 7, 1954. He followed the usual Jesuit education with the addition of physics and mathematics. He entered the Polish Province of the Society of Jesus but transferred to the Canadian Province a few years later.

In 1965 he received a doctorate degree in physics (Ph.D.), followed by a licentiate in philosophy from Saint Louis University.

On June 1, 1968, he was ordained a priest in the Roman Catholic Church.

As professor of physics at Saint Mary's University in Halifax, he specialized in astrophysics and microwave technology. He wrote a high school textbook on radio-physics, which is still used today, and had served for several years as a visiting short-term teacher at Bellarmine College Preparatory in San Jose, California. Fascinated by amateur radio, he soon became an expert in it. In his capacity as a researcher, he was one of the few people to gain access to the environmentally sensitive Sable Island, off the coast of Nova Scotia.

He had a sabbatical year in 1990–1991, and spent it in Tucson, Arizona, with the Vatican Observatory team. He was dedicated to reflections on the relationship between science and religion in the modern age. When he achieved Professor Emeritus status in 1995, he was among the last Jesuit professors to retire from the university, which was under Jesuit administration from 1937 to 1970.

Since his retirement, he worked assiduously in translating and editing a series of publications pertaining to the Jesuit Missions in Canada, beginning with the mission at Port Royal (today's Nova Scotia) in 1611 and reaching the 1860s. Fr. Lonc's areas of specialization included the early history of the Society of Jesus in the Maritimes, in Quebec and in 19th century Ontario. Most of the material consisted of translations from French and Latin of letters, diaries, and Reports (Relations), including the French historical works by Lucien Campeau, and is therefore basic data for historiographers.

In his final years he served as chaplain to the Sisters of St. Joseph in Toronto. He died on November 27, 2014, at the René Goupil House, the Jesuit infirmary in Pickering, Ontario, aged 85 years, having lived 60 years in religious life in the Society of Jesus.

== Published works ==
=== As author ===
- William Lonc. Radio Astronomy Projects: A Hands-On Guide to Exploring the Radio Universe (Third Edition, 2006). Third Edition. Radio-Sky Publishing, 2006. 292 pp. ISBN 9781889076072

=== Volumes in the English series: Early Jesuit Missions in Canada ===
General Editor and Publisher: William Lonc, S.J.

- 1. Lucien Campeau, S.J. Biographical Dictionary for New France: 1602‑1656. Transl. by George Topp, S.J. and William Lonc, S.J.
- 2.Brébeuf's Writings: A Study, by René Latourelle. S.J. Transl. by George Topp, S.J. and William Lonc, S.J.
- 3. Lucien Campeau. S.J. Jesuit Mission to the Hurons. Transl. by George Topp, S.J. and William Lonc, S.J.
- 4. Lucien Campeau, S.J. Gannentaha: First Jesuit Mission to the Iroquois. Transl. by George Topp, S.J. and William Lonc, S.J.
- 5. Jean Côté. The Donnés in Huronia. Transl. by George Topp, S.J. and William Lonc, S.J.
- 6‑1 and 6‑2. Letters from the New Jesuit Missions in Canada: 1843‑1852. Edited by Lorenzo Cadieux, S.J.. Transl. by George Topp, S.J. and William Lonc, S.J.
- 6-3: Lorenzo Cadieux, S.J. and Robert Toupin, S.J. (Eds.).Letters from Manitoulin Island: 1853-1870. Transl. by Shelley Pearen and William Lonc, S.J. 2007. ISBN 978-0-9739886-4-2
- 6-4: Letters from Wikwemikong: 1845-1863. Transcribed and translated by Shelley Pearen and William Lonc, S.J.
- 6-5: Nicholas Point, S.J. Memoirs of Wikwemikong: Mid 1800s. Transcribed and translated by Shelley Pearen and William Lonc, S.J.
- 6-6: Letters from the Ft. William Jesuit Mission: 1848-1862. Transcribed and translated by Shelley Pearen and William Lonc, S.J.
- 6-7: Letters from the Sault Ste Marie Jesuit Mission: 1850-1863. Transcribed and translated by Shelley Pearen and William Lonc, S.J.
- 6-8: Letters from the Jesuit Mission at Sandwich: 1843-1860. Transcribed and translated by Shelley Pearen and William Lonc, S.J.
- 6-9. Pierre Potier. Jesuit Mission Correspondence: 1746-1781. Ed. by R. Toupin, S.J.. Transl. by William Lonc, S.J.
- 7. Pierre Cholenec, S.J. Catherine Tekakwitha. Transl. by William Lonc, S.J.
- 7-1. Félix Martin, S.J. Catherine Tekakwitha: Lily of the Mohawks. Translated by Henry Van Rensselaer, S.J.; Post-translated by William Lonc, S.J.

(contains only the English part of Volume 7-2)

- 7-2. Félix Martin, S.J. Catherine Tegaouïtha: Iroquois Maiden. English and French versions. English translation by Henry Van Rennsaeler, S.J.; post-translated by W. Lonc, S.J.
- 8. Fr. Chaumonot, S.J.: Autobiography and Supplement. Transl. by William Lonc, S.J.
- 9: Jean de Brébeuf. Huron Relations for 1635 and 1636. Ed. by Lucien Campeau, S.J.; Post-translated by William Lonc, S.J.
- 9‑1: François Le Mercier. Huron Relations for 1637 and 1638. Ed. by Lucien Campeau, S.J.; Post-translated by William Lonc, S.J.
- 9‑2: Jérôme Lalemant. Huron Relations for 1639 to 1645. Ed. by Lucien Campeau, S.J.; Post-translated by William Lonc, S.J.
- 9‑3: Paul Ragueneau. Huron Relations for 1646 to 1650. Ed. by Lucien Campeau, S.J., Post-translated by William Lonc, S.J.
- 9-4: Lucien Campeau, S.J. Jesuit Huron Mission Latin Letters:1626-1650. Transl. by William Lonc, S.J. and others.
- 9-5: Paul Ragueneau, S.J. Memoirs: 1652. A translation. Ed. by William Lonc, S.J.
- 10: Lucien Campeau, S.J. Jesuit Mission to the Souriquois in Acadia: 1611‑1613. Post-translated by William Lonc, S.J.
- 11: Lucien Campeau, S.J. The Jesuits and Early Montreal. Transl. by William Lonc, S.J. March, 2005. ISBN 0-9687053-6-7
- 12: Lucien Campeau, S.J. The Jesuit Missions in Acadia and New France: 1616‑1634. Post-translated by William Lonc, S.J.
- 13: Pierre Biard S.J. Jesuit Mission in Acadia: 1611‑1613. Ed. by Lucien Campeau S.J.. Transl. by George Topp, S.J. and William Lonc, S.J.
- 14: Paul Le Jeune, S.J. Québec Relations for 1632, 1633, 1634. Ed. by Lucien Campeau, S.J. Post‑translated by William Lonc, S.J.
- 14‑1: Paul Le Jeune, S.J. Québec Relations for 1635, 1636, 1637. Ed. by Lucien Campeau, S.J. Post‑translated by William Lonc, S.J.
- 14‑2: Paul Le Jeune, S.J. Québec Relations for 1638, 1639, 1640. Ed. by Lucien Campeau, S.J. Post‑translated by William Lonc, S.J.
- 15: D. F. Shanahan. The Jesuit Residential School at Spanish.
- 16: Jesuit Journal: 1645‑1668, (Journal des Jésuites). Laverdière and Casgrain. Lucien Campeau; Reuben Thwaites, Eds. Post‑translated by William Lonc, S.J.
- 17: A Mission Diary: 1843, Dominique du Ranquet, S.J. Ed. by Fernand Ouellet and René Dionne. Translated by William Lonc, S.J.
- 17-1: Mission Journal: 1853-1856, Dominique du Ranquet, S.J. Original transcribed and edited by Alain Nabarra. Transl. by William Lonc, S.J.
- 17-1: Mission Journal: 1875-1877, Dominique du Ranquet, S.J.. Original transcribed and edited by Alain Nabarra. Transl. by William Lonc, S.J., and William Maurice, S.J.
- 18. Ft. William Mission Diary: 1848-1852. Original transcribed and edited by Alain Nabarra. Transl. by William Lonc, S.J.
- 19. François Maynard, S.J. Jesuit Missions in Northern Ontario. Transl. by William Lonc, S.J.
- 19-1. François Maynard, S.J. Du Ranquet's Diary: 1852-1877, A "Copy". Transl. by William Lonc, S.J. and Shelley Pearen.

=== Other related translations/publications ===
- René Latourelle, S.J. Jean de Brébeuf. Transl. by William Lonc, S.J.

=== Volumes in the French series Missions anciennes des Jésuites au Canada ===
- Jean Côté. Institution des Donnés à Sainte-Marie-des-Hurons. French version of Volume 5.
- François Maynard, S.J. Missions jésuites du Nord de l'Ontario. Transcription par Robert Toupin, S.J., édité par William Lonc, S.J., French version of Volume 19.
- Lucien Campeau, S.J. Montréal, fondation missionnaire. French version of Volume 11.
- Dominique du Ranquet, S.J. Journal de mission: 1853-1856. édité par Alain Nabarra. French version of Volume 17-1(1853-1856).
- Journal de mission: 1875-1877. Dominique du Ranquet, S.J., édité par Alain Nabarra. French version of Volume 17-1(1875-1877).
- La Mission jésuite de Ft. William: Journal de 1848-1852. edité par Alain Nabarra, French version of Volume 18.
- Lettres de la Mission jésuite au Ft. William: 1848-1862. Transcribed by Shelley Pearen and William Lonc, S.J., French version of Volume 6-6.
- Lettres de la Mission jésuite au Sault Ste Marie: 1850-1863. Transcription et traduction par Shelley Pearen et William Lonc, S.J., French version of volume 6-7.
- Lettres de la Mission jésuite à Sandwich: 1843-1860. Transcription et traduction par Shelley Pearen et William Lonc, S.J. French version of volume 6-8.
- Journal du Père du Ranquet S.J., de 1852 à 1877." Copie, par François Maynard, S.J. Transcription par William Lonc, S.J. et Shelley Pearen, French version of volume 19-1.
- Mémoires: 1652, par Paul Ragueneau, S.J. Transcription par William Lonc, S.J.

(French-Latin version of our volume 9-5).

== See also ==
- Jesuit Missions in North America
- Jesuit Missions amongst the Huron
