= Mag Raj Jain =

Indian social worker

Mag Raj Jain (1931 – 4 November 2014) was a social worker of Rajasthan state in India and recipient of the Padma Shri award for his contribution to the development of the Thar Desert region. A teacher by profession, in 1990 he founded the Society to Uplift Rural Economy (SURE) to work for the betterment of the poor in the Barmer district of Rajasthan. Presently the organisation reaches out to more than 30,000 people spread across 60 villages of the region.

For the population of the region – consisting mostly of scheduled castes, scheduled tribes and refugees of the Indo-Pakistani wars and conflicts – major source of income is the traditional craft of patchwork and mirror embroidery practiced by the women of the area. Over the years contractors and middlemen exploited this trade by garnering major share of the profits. The non-profit SURE organisation aims to remove the middle-men involved and to provide maximum benefits to the local craftspeople.
