= Whitey Adolfson =

American football and wrestling coach (1931–2014)

Biographical details
- Born: November 11, 1931; Belmont, West Virginia, U.S.
- Died: November 10, 2014 (aged 82); Charleston, West Virginia, U.S.

Playing career

Football
- 1949: West Virginia
- 1950–1953: West Virginia Tech
- Positions: Center, linebacker

Coaching career (HC unless noted)

Football
- 1966–1967: Glenville State (assistant)
- 1968–1974: Glenville State (DC)
- 1975–1979: Glenville State

Basketball
- 1967?–1968?: Glenville State (assistant)

Wrestling
- 1968–1975: Glenville State

Administrative career (AD unless noted)
- 1980–1985: Glenville State (assistant AD)

Earl Carl "Whitey" Adolfson Jr. (November 11, 1931 – November 10, 2014) was an American football and wrestling coach. He served as the head football coach at Glenville State College in Glenville, West Virginia from 1975 to 1979.
