= Robert Sonkowsky =

American classical scholar (1931–2014)

Robert Paul Sonkowsky
- Born: 16 September 1931; Appleton, Wisconsin
- Died: 16 November 2014 (aged 83); North Oaks, Minnesota

Robert Sonkowsky (September 16, 1931 - November 16, 2014) was a professor emeritus of Classical and Near Eastern Studies at the University of Minnesota. He was an authority on Latin rhetoric and the pronunciation of Golden Age Latin. His bachelor's degree was from Lawrence College (1954), and his PhD from the University of North Carolina (1958). He was an Honorary Member of the Center for Chronobiology in the Mayo Building, Medical School.

Sonkowsky was a leading authority on and a performer of oral renditions of classical texts. He made the album Homer: The Death of Patroclus - Chapter XVI of the Iliad with Folkways Records as part of the Smithsonian Center for Folklife and Cultural Heritage. Numerous other recordings of his in classical Greek and Latin are available on the Internet.

== Selected publications ==
- Performance of Literature in Historical Perspective ed. D. Thompson et al. (Univ. Press of America 1983) Chapters 1 and 2 (pp. 1–65): "Oral Performance and Ancient Greek Lit." and "Oral Interpretation of Classical Latin Literature."
- "Euphantastik Memory and Delivery in the Classical Rhetorical Tradition," Rhetoric 78 ed. Brown and Steinmann, 1979, pp. 375–3??
- "Critical Edition of the Latin Rhetorical Treatise De Compositione by Gasparino Barzizza of Bergamo", American Philosophical Society: Year Book, 1962, p. 629.
- "Delivery in Ancient Rhetorical Theory," Transactions and Proceedings of the American Philological Association 90 (1959), pp. 256–274.
