= Robert A. Falk =

American politician

Robert A. "Bob" Falk (June 3, 1926 – November 13, 2014) was an American farmer and legislator.

Born in Hagali Township, Beltrami County, Minnesota, Falk graduated from Bemidji High School. He served in the United States Navy during World War II. Falk was a farmer. Falk served in the Minnesota House of Representatives from 1969 to 1972. He died in Bemidji, Minnesota.
