= Liudvikas Simutis =

Lithuanian politician

Liudvikas Simutis (August 27, 1935 – November 4, 2014) was a Lithuanian politician. In 1990 he was among those who signed the Act of the Re-Establishment of the State of Lithuania. He died in Kaunas, aged 79.
