= Joe Dunne (British Army soldier) =

Decorated British soldier (1914–2014)

Joseph Dunne (8 June 1914 – 11 November 2014) was a sergeant in the Irish Guards who was awarded the Distinguished Conduct Medal and the Arctic Star.
