= J. V. Shetty =

Jagannath Venkanna Shetty was an Indian banker. He was Chairman and Managing Director of Canara Bank, Chairman of Indian Banks' Association from January 1993 - August 1994. He also headed the J. V. Shetty Banking Committee of India which decided on the crucial issue of consortium lending by Indian Banks.

Shetty died on 17 November 2014 at the age of 78.
