= Luciano Soli =

Italian field hockey player (1937–2014)

Personal information
- Nationality: Italian
- Born: 12 October 1937 Rome, Italy
- Died: 5 November 2014 (aged 77)

Sport
- Sport: Field hockey

Luciano Soli (12 October 1937 – 5 November 2014) was an Italian field hockey player. He competed in the men's tournament at the 1960 Summer Olympics in Rome.
