= J. Edward Kidder Jr. =

Japanologist, archaeologist, and university teacher

Jonathan Edward Kidder Jr.
- Born: June 24, 1922; Jigongshan, Henan, China
- Died: November 30, 2014 (aged 92); Crossnore, North Carolina, U.S.
- Education: Maryville College (B.A.); New York University (A.M., Ph.D.)
- Employer(s): Washington University in St. Louis (1950–1956); International Christian University (1956–1993)
- Spouse: Cordelia Dellinger (m. 1944–2013)
- Children: 4

Jonathan Edward Kidder Jr. (24 June 1922 – 30 November 2014) was an American archaeologist, art historian of ancient Japan, and professor emeritus at the International Christian University (ICU). He received an Order of the Sacred Treasure in 1992 for his contribution to the study of Japanese culture.

== Life and career ==
J. Edward Kidder Jr. was born in Chikungshan (Jigongshan), China to missionary parents. He received his B.A. from Maryville College in 1943 before serving in the United States Third Army from 1943 to 1945. After the war, he continued his education at New York University where he received his A.M. in 1949 and his Ph.D. in 1955. After a year (1949–50) at the École du Louvre in Paris, he taught at Washington University in St. Louis from 1950 to 1956. From 1953 to 1954 he stayed at Kyoto University on a Fulbright scholarship. In 1956 he accepted a position at the International Christian University in Mitaka, Tokyo, where he remained until his retirement in 1993. At ICU, in addition to directing several archeological excavations throughout Japan, Kidder also served Director of the ICU Archeology Research Center, Director of the Yuasa Hachiro Memorial Museum, Dean of the College of Liberal Arts, and Vice President of Academic Affairs.

== Selected bibliography ==
Kidder authored over ten books.

- Early Chinese Bronzes in the City Art Museum of St. Louis (The City Art Museum of St. Louis, 1956).
- The Jomon Pottery of Japan (Institute of Fine Arts, New York University, 1957).
- Japan Before Buddhism (London: Thames and Hudson; New York: Praeger, 1959).
- Masterpieces of Japanese Sculpture (Charles E. Tuttle, 1961).
- Japanese Temples (Abrams, 1964).
- Ancient Japan (London: Weindenfeld & Nicolson; New York: John Day, 1964).
- Early Japanese Art (London: Thames & Hudson; New York: Van Nostrand, 1964).
- The Birth of Japanese Art (London: Allen & Unwin; New York: Praeger, 1965).
- Prehistory Japanese Arts: Jomon Pottery (Kodansha International, 1968).
- The Art of Japan (Century Publishing, 1985).
- The Lucky Seventh: Early Hōryū-ji and its Time (ICU Harchiro Yuasa Memorial Museum, 1999).
- Himiko and Japan’s Elusive Chiefdom of Yamatai: Archaeology, History, and Mythology (University of Hawai’i Press, 2007).
- A View from the Trenches of Mitaka: Experiences in Japanese Archeology (ICU Hachiro Yuasa Memorial Museum, 2013).
