= Ruth B. Loving =

American activist (1914–2014)

- Born: Ruth B. Stewart; May 27, 1914; Phoenixville, Pennsylvania, U.S.
- Died: November 25, 2014 (aged 100); Springfield, Massachusetts, U.S.
- Education: University of Massachusetts Amherst
- Spouse: Minor Loving (m. 1935)
- Children: 3

Ruth B. Loving (May 27, 1914-November 25, 2014) was an American activist. She has been called "the mother of civil rights" in Springfield, Massachusetts.

== Early life ==
Loving was born in Phoenixville, Pennsylvania, the youngest of seven children of Alexander and Emma Stewart. Around 1918, she and her family moved to New Haven, Connecticut, where her father worked at the Winchester gun factory. As a young child, Loving wasn't fully aware of racial discrimination, due to the lack of overt racial discrimination in New Haven, but she later became a youth member of the NAACP. She attended the Gregory Street School, where she was the only girl to join their Fife and Drum Corp, and Hillhouse High School, where she studied French.

== Adult life ==
After marrying Minor Loving in 1935, the couple moved to Boston with her husband, where Ruth Loving worked as a singer and her husband worked for a dry cleaning business. The family moved to Springfield, Massachusetts in 1939, after Minor Loving's job was relocated. Ruth Loving joined the city's chapter of the NAACP in 1942.

In the early 1940s, Loving also began playing with a musical group, Carl Loving and the Trio.

After the Second World War began, Loving volunteered to work as an entertainer for the United Services Organizations in Chicopee. In August 1943, she joined the Massachusetts Women’s Defense Corps, a unit of the National Guard. She learned morse code and sent government communications from a secret facility in Springfield.

She founded the PTA of Chester Street Junior High, and served as its president in the mid-1950s.

In the 1960s, Loving became president of the Springfield NAACP and founded the Springfield Negro Post. In 1965, she met both Martin Luther King Jr. and Rosa Parks when they visited Springfield. Following King's assassination, then-Mayor Frank H. Freedman made Loving chairperson of the city's first King memorial observance. For the observance, she organized a choir drawn from churches across the city. Following the event, the 'Freedom Choir' remained active and continued to perform.

In 1969, she began working in local radio; she hosted a radio show on WMAS-AM and FM until 2011. That same year, she became the first Black woman certified candidate for the Springfield City Council.

In 1988, Loving earned a bachelor's degree in Community Education and Media at University of Massachusetts Amherst.

In 1995, Loving served as a delegate to the White House Council on Aging. In 1998, Loving initiated the tradition of raising the Black American Heritage Flag in front of Springfield's City Hall during Black History Month.

In her later years, she served as a delegate to the Springfield Council on Aging.

In 2008, she campaigned locally for Barack Obama's presidential campaign.

In 2011, she advocated for the reopening of the Mason Square Library.

Loving died of a heart attack at age 100, while in rehabilitation at Wingate Nursing Home in Springfield following a broken hip.

== Honors and awards ==
In 1994, Loving received the Eyes on the Prize award from WGBY-TV.

The Springfield Theological Society conferred Loving an Honorary Doctor of Humanities Degree in recognition of her contributions to the city.

In 2018, UMASS Amherst began a scholarship in Loving's name, which aims to help fund adult students returning to college later in life.

== Personal life ==
Loving had 3 children. She considered herself a Democrat.
