= Stanisław Majcher =

Polish footballer

Personal information
- Date of birth: 24 October 1936
- Place of birth: Trzebownisko, Poland
- Date of death: 17 November 2014 (aged 78)
- Place of death: Rzeszów, Poland
- Height: 1.74 m (5 ft 9 in)
- Position: Goalkeeper

Senior career*
Years	Team	Apps	(Gls)
- LZS Trzebownisko
- LZS Zaczernie
- Stal Rzeszów
- KS Śremski
- Stal Rzeszów
- Wisłoka Dębica
1970–1973	Stal Mielec		
- Toronto Falcons

International career
1966	Poland	3	(0)
- * Club domestic league appearances and goals

Stanisław Majcher (24 October 1936 – 17 November 2014) was a Polish footballer who played as a goalkeeper.

He played in three matches for the Poland national football team in 1966.

In 1974, he played in the National Soccer League with Toronto Falcons. He also played in the NSL All-Star match against Hajduk Split.

== Honours ==
Stal Mielec

- Ekstraklasa: 1972–73
