= Anthony Hayde =

New Zealand field hockey player

Personal information
- Nationality: New Zealand
- Born: 5 December 1932 Dehradun, British India
- Died: 20 November 2014 (aged 81)

Sport
- Sport: Field hockey

Anthony Hayde (5 December 1932 – 20 November 2014) was an Indian-born New Zealand field hockey player. He competed in the men's tournament at the 1960 Summer Olympics.
