= Lino Celaya =

Mexican politician

Lino Celaya Luria
- Born: 23 September 1949; Oaxaca, Oaxaca, Mexico
- Died: 18 November 2014 (aged 65)
- Occupation: Politician
- Political party: PRI (1988–2012); PANAL(2012–2014)

Lino Francisco Celaya Luria (23 September 1949 – 18 November 2014) was a Mexican politician affiliated with the New Alliance Party (formerly to the Institutional Revolutionary Party). He served as Deputy of the LIX Legislature of the Mexican Congress as a plurinominal representative (2003–2006).

He died on November 18, 2014, due to pancreatic cancer.
