= Dick Breaden =

Australian rugby league footballer and administrator

Personal information
- Full name: Richard John Breaden
- Born: 1944; Sydney, New South Wales, Australia
- Died: 2 November 2014; Engadine, New South Wales

Playing information
- Position: Prop
Club
Years	Team	Pld	T	G	FG	P
1967–69	St. George	9	0	0	0	0

Richard Breaden (1944–2014) was an Australian rugby league footballer who played in the 1960s.

Breaden played three seasons of first grade with St. George Dragons. He was a big fast Front Row forward from the Sutherland Shire although his career was cut short by injury. He finished his career in Third Grade in 1970.

Breaden died on 2 November 2014 at Engadine, New South Wales.
