= William Waffle Thomas =

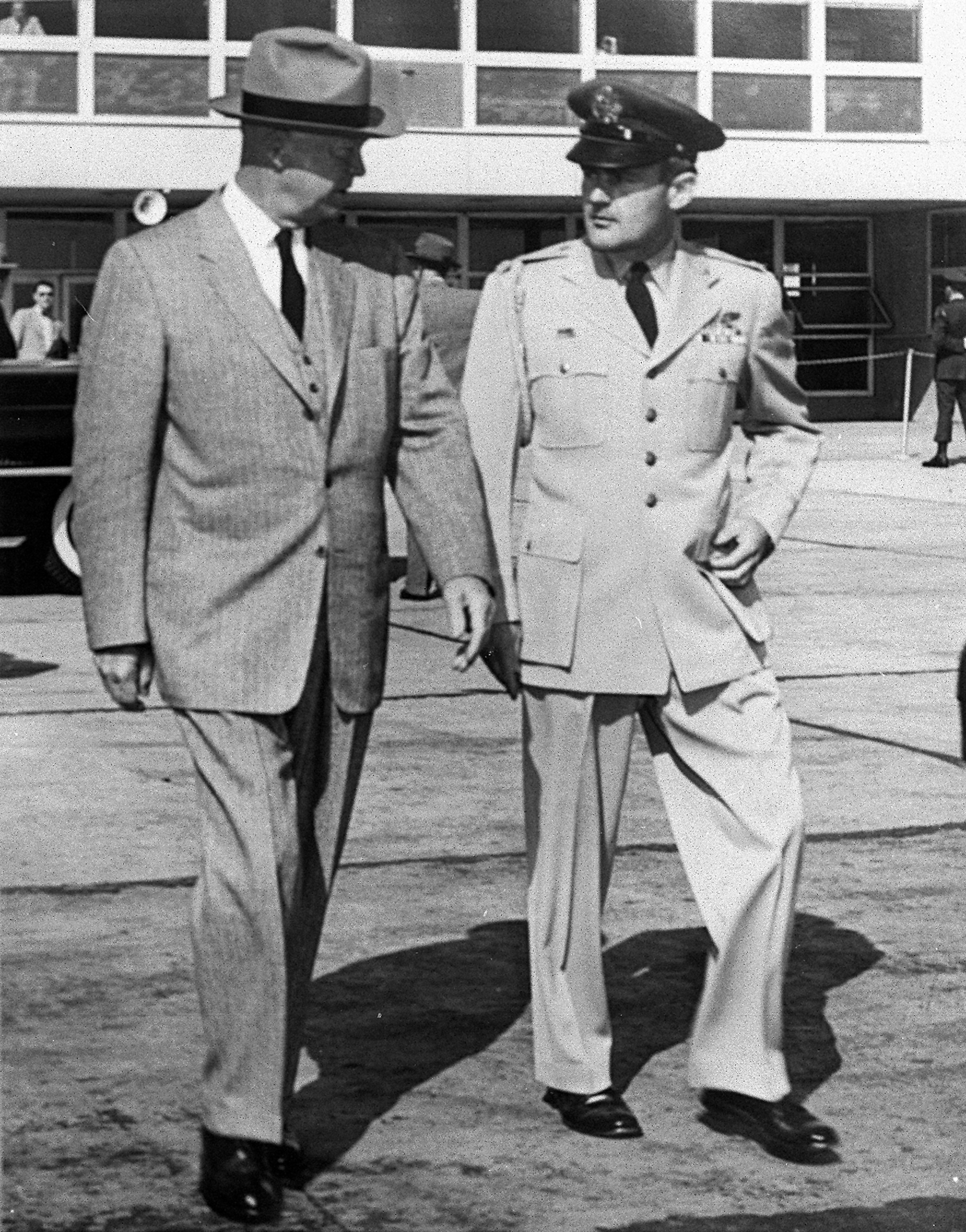
Ike and Thomas

William Waffle Thomas (December 29, 1919 – November 22, 2014) was an American Air Force officer who served as an Air Force One pilot for President Dwight D. Eisenhower from 1953 until 1961. The call sign of "Air Force One" was used after an Eastern Airline flight having the same call sign with Eisenhower's flight shared the same aerospace. Thomas personally consider it a benign incident. In 1968, he received the Legion of Merit, the nation's second highest award.

In 1942, Thomas was commissioned as a second lieutenant in the Army Air Force. During World War II, he served two years serving as a pilot in the China Burma India Theater. In 1948, he flew C-52s during the Berlin Airlift. In 1971, he retired as a colonel.
