= Wally Buhaj =

Australian rules footballer

Personal information
- Full name: Wally Buhaj
- Born: 5 May 1947
- Died: 14 November 2014 (aged 67); Brisbane
- Original team: Oak Park
- Height: 174 cm (5 ft 9 in)
- Weight: 70 kg (154 lb)
- Position: Half-forward

Playing career^{1}
Years	Club	Games (Goals)
1967–69	Essendon	15 (3)
- ^{1} Playing statistics correct to the end of 1969.

Wally Buhaj (5 May 1947 – 14 November 2014) was an Australian rules footballer who played with Essendon in the Victorian Football League (VFL). He won Essendon's reserves best and fairest in 1968, the year they won the premiership. After leaving Essendon, Buhaj played with Burnie in Tasmania, before moving to Queensland and playing for Mayne, Wilston Grange and Strathpine.
