= Peter Allen (physician) =

Canadian surgeon (1921–2014)

- Born: December 13, 1921; Philadelphia, Pennsylvania, United States
- Died: November 17, 2014 (aged 92); Oakville, Ontario, Canada
- Citizenship: Canadian
- Education: University of Toronto, 1946
- Occupation: Surgeon
- Years active: 1954 to 2006
- Notable work: first open heart operation in British Columbia
- Awards: McLaughlin Fellowship and Nuffield Travelling Fellowship

Peter Allen (December 13, 1921 – November 17, 2014) was a Canadian surgeon who played a leading role in improving cardiac surgery techniques. Along with Dr. Philip Ashmore, Dr. W.G. (Bill) Trapp and Dr. Ross Robertson, he performed the first Open Heart Surgery in British Columbia on 29 October 1957 at Vancouver General Hospital, by closing an Atrial Septal Defect (ASD) in 9 year old John Evans, using Cardiopulmonary Bypass (CPB).

== Background ==
Allen grew up in Vancouver, British Columbia. In 1946, he obtained an MD from the University of Toronto. In 1953, he received a Fellowship in general surgery from the Royal College of Physicians and Surgeons of Canada and, in 1964, a Fellowship in thoracic surgery from the same institution.

His post graduate training included one year of internal medicine at the University of Amsterdam, the Netherlands followed by 4 1/2 years at the University of Toronto in the general surgery program at the Hospital for Sick Children and the Toronto General Hospital.

Returning to Vancouver, between early 1954 to mid-1956, he developed a practice in general surgery. During that period he held a research position at the British Columbia Research Institute under the direction of Dr. Kenneth Evelyn. The project tested the feasibility of replacing a diseased abdominal aorta with a mesh supported vena cava autograft In mid 1956 he began a year of training in Cardiac surgery with C. Walton Lillehei, the originator of Open-heart surgery, at the University of Minnesota in Minneapolis. In early 1957, he participated in the operation where the world's first artificial cardiac pacemaker was employed by Lillehei.

== Career ==
In mid 1957 Allen returned to Vancouver and formed a cardiac team with surgeon, Philip Ashmore, anaesthetist William Dodds and paediatrician Morris Young. On October 29, 1957, at the Vancouver General Hospital, the team successfully performed the first open heart operation in British Columbia. He also performed the first Coronary Artery Bypass Graft surgery in Cardiff, Wales

In 1977 to 1980 Allen was invited to establish a cardiac surgical certre at the Kasturba General Hospital, Bhopal, India. The Indian surgeon, Dr. Raj Bisaryia, who had trained in Vancouver continued the program between Dr. Allen's visits.

In 1987 and 1989 Allen was the visiting cardiac surgeon at the Ibn-al;Bitar Hospital in Baghdad, Iraq. The hospital was built and staffed by the Irish construction company, PARC. The doctors, nurses and technicians were Irish, the only Iraqis were the patients and interpreters. Many patients lived in remote areas with minimal access to medical care. Consequently, most of the cardiac valve replacements used bioprosthetic {porcine tissue ]that required no anticoagulant therapy post operative, compared to the mechanical artificial valve that did require anticoagulants.

1990 to 1999 Allen was a chairman of medical review panels of the British Columbia Worker's Compensation Board; he chaired 275 Panels. From 1972 to 1988 he established the annual Peter Allen Surgical Essay Award, open to senior cardio-thoracic trainees in the United Kingdom.

In 1993, after 36 years of surgical practice, he retired as an Emeritus Clinical Professor of Surgery at the University of British Columbia Faculty of Medicine. In 1995 he moved to Oakville, Ontario and joined the Medical Clinic of Dr. Sapra and Dr. Khanna as a consultant in peripheral vascular disease, until retirement in 2006.

Allen died on November 17, 2014, at the age of 92.

== Honours and awards ==
1956 - Annual research prize of the British Columbia Surgical Society for work on the diseased abdominal aorta.

1957 - McLaughlin Fellowship to study cardiac surgery under Dr. Lillehei in Minneapolis.

1964 - Nuffield Travelling Fellowship to further study cardiac surgery at the Brompton Hospital in London and the Sulley Chest Hospital in Cardiff, Wales.

1972 - Invitation to address the Society of Thoracic and Cardiac Surgeons of Great Britain and Ireland.

1978 - Vancouver Medical Association annual Osler Address.

1980 - Invitation to join the Pete's Club composed of United Kingdom and Western European cardiac surgeons. The meetings were unique in that only surgical failures and problem cases were discussed. He held the final meeting of the Pete's Club at the Vancouver General Hospital in 1989.

1998–present Member, Board of Directors, Ian Anderson House, Cancer Hospice, Oakville, ON

2011–present Joined the Grants Committee of the Oakville Community Foundation, a philanthropic group, Oakville, ON.
