= Terry Bulloch =

Royal Air Force officer

- Born: Terence Malcolm Bulloch; 19 February 1916; Lisburn, County Antrim, Ireland
- Died: 13 November 2014 (aged 98); Buckinghamshire, England
- Military career
- Allegiance: United Kingdom
- Branch: Royal Air Force
- Service years: 1936–1946
- Rank: Squadron Leader
- Service number: 39373
- Unit: No. 120 Squadron
- Awards: Distinguished Service Order & Bar; Distinguished Flying Cross & Bar

Squadron Leader Terence Malcolm Bulloch, DSO* DFC* (19 February 1916 – 13 November 2014) was a Royal Air Force Coastal Command pilot during the Second World War. He carried out the highest number of attacks on U-boats during the Battle of the Atlantic, sinking a record total of three (U-597, U-611 and U-514).

== Early life ==
Bulloch, along with his twin sister Yvonne, was born on 19 February 1916 in Lisburn, County Antrim, to Samuel, a linen trader, and Elsie Bulloch. His family moved to Malone Park, Belfast, when Bulloch was very young. Bulloch was educated at Mourne Grange School in Kilkeel and later Campbell College, Belfast – the same schools as his older brother Hugh Larmor McLearn Bulloch. While at Campbell College, he joined the Officers' Training Corps, becoming the sergeant piper. Bulloch became interested in joining the Royal Air Force after attending a lecture by a Wing Commander from RAF Aldergrove at Campbell College, who offered a flight in a Vickers Virginia.

== Military service ==
=== 1936–1941 ===
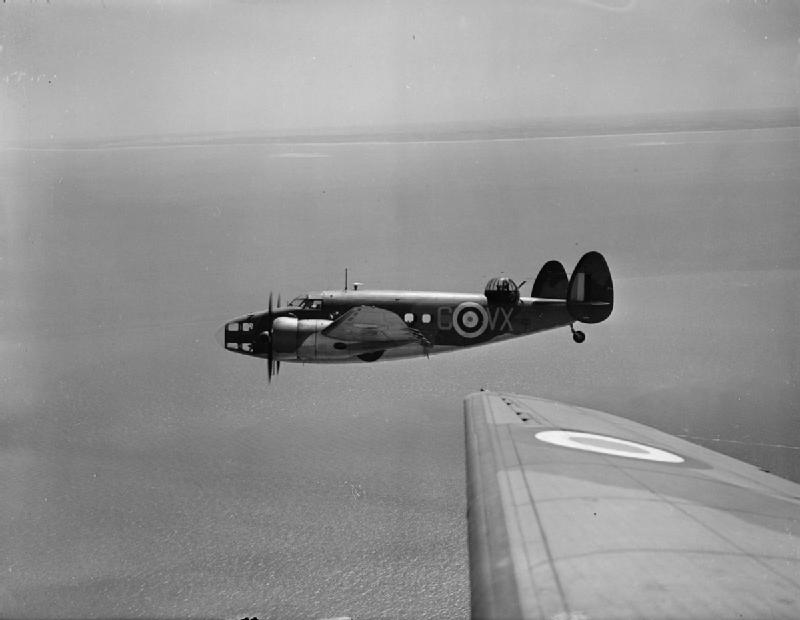
A No. 206 Squadron Lockheed Hudson Mk.I, which Bulloch flew between March and December 1940.

Bulloch signed up with the Royal Air Force in 1936 on a short service commission, having been denied entry to Royal Air Force College Cranwell on medical grounds. He underwent his initial training at Prestwick, Ayrshire, in the winter of 1936, before moving on to No. 6 Flying Training School at RAF Netheravon, flying the Hawker Hart and Hawker Audax. He received his commission as a Pilot officer in May 1937. Bulloch was posted to No. 220 Squadron, Coastal Command, who were based at RAF Bircham Newton, Norfolk, flying Avro Anson Mk.Is. He was flying with No. 220 Squadron at the outbreak of war in September 1939, before being transferred to No. 206 Squadron in early 1940. Bulloch began flying the Lockheed Hudson Mk.I after they were delivered to the squadron in March 1940.

While operating the Hudson, Bulloch flew sorties over the Dutch, Belgian and French coasts – helping to support the British Expeditionary Force evacuate Dunkirk in May/June 1940. During this time, Bulloch shot down two German aircraft and was part of a detachment at RAF Aldergrove to flew anti-submarine sorties over the Atlantic. In September 1940, he attacked Channel ports that were being used in preparation for Operation Sea Lion. At the end of his first tour, Bulloch was awarded Distinguished Flying Cross (DFC) in October 1940, and was mentioned in dispatches the next month.

Now a Flight Lieutenant, in December 1940 instead of being given leave, Bulloch was assigned to what would become RAF Ferry Command and was tasked with bringing aircraft across from North America to the United Kingdom. On 13/14 April 1941, Bulloch became the first pilot to fly the Boeing B-17 Flying Fortress (known as the Fortress Mk.I in RAF service) across the Atlantic, arriving at Prestwick after an eight-hour flight. Bulloch later delivered Consolidated Liberator GR.Is in June 1941.

=== No. 120 Squadron ===
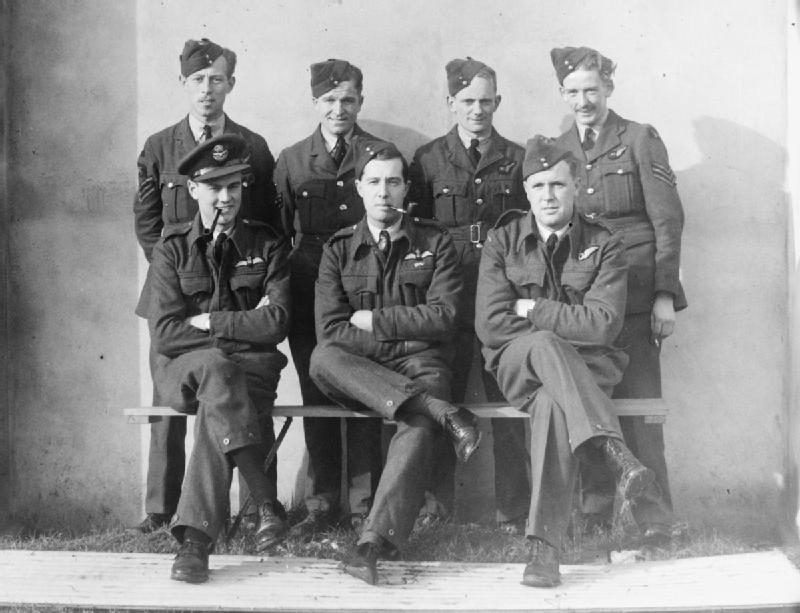
Bulloch (seated middle) with the crew of his Liberator while serving with No. 120 Squadron, circa 1941–42.

No. 120 Squadron was stood-up at RAF Nutts Corner, County Antrim, on 2 June 1941 as a maritime reconnaissance unit, equipped with the Liberator GR.I. Bulloch marked a return to operational duties in August 1941, when he was posted to No. CXX Squadron. On 21 October 1941, he participated in the squadron's first attack against a U-Boat using three depth charges, however the damage was inconclusive. Bulloch made six more U-Boat sightings over the next nine months, before relocating to RAF Ballykelly, County Londonderry, in July 1942. In September 1942, he was detached to RAF Reykjavik in Iceland, from here Bulloch sank the squadron's first submarine U-597 in the mid-Atlantic on 12 October 1942 while flying AM929. For his successful attack, Bulloch was awarded a bar to his DFC. On 1 December 1942, he was awarded the Distinguished Service Order (DSO) for his attacks on U-89 and U-132 on 5 November, for which he was credited with sinking U-132 and damaging U-89. On 8 December 1942, Bulloch came to the aid of convoy HX.217 who were under attack by a wolfpack – sinking U-611 and attacking another five with depth charges and machine gun fire – including U-254 which was sunk after it had collided with U-211. Bulloch left No. 120 Squadron in December 1942. On 1 January 1943, Bulloch was awarded a bar to his DSO.

=== No. 224 Squadron ===
In July 1943, Bulloch was attached to No. 224 Squadron at RAF St. Eval, Cornwall to test the use of rockets on the Liberator. Bulloch flew his first sortie with a rocket-fitted Liberator on 5 July but made no sightings. With No. 224 Squadron, Bulloch carried out an attack on U-514 on 8 July 1943, sinking it with depth charges near Cape Finisterre with BZ721, having initially attacked with rockets.

=== 1944–1946 ===
In 1944, Bulloch joined No. 231 Squadron, which had reformed on 8 September 1944 at Dorval, Canada. With No. 231 Squadron, he primarily ferried aircraft across the Atlantic. By the time he left the RAF in July 1946, Bulloch had logged 4,658 flying hours (2,059 on operations) and 350 operational sorties, including 1,721 hours on Liberators.

== Later life ==
Bulloch joined the British Overseas Airways Corporation (BOAC) as a Senior Captain in July 1946. While with BOAC, he flew numerous types such as the Lockheed L-749 Constellation, Boeing 377 Stratocruiser, Boeing 707 and Boeing 747. By the time he retired in 1974, Bulloch had flown over six million miles and had crossed the Atlantic 1,113 times.

Bulloch died on 13 November 2014. The Royal Air Force named a Boeing Poseidon MRA1 ZP803 in his honour.
