= Bob Ewbank =

American gridiron football player (1928–2014)

Profile
- Position: Quarterback

Personal information
- Born: January 26, 1928; Oklahoma, U.S.
- Died: November 7, 2014 (aged 86); Denver, Colorado, U.S.
- Listed height: 5 ft 11 in (1.80 m)
- Listed weight: 185 lb (84 kg)

Career information
- College: Oklahoma

Career history
- 1953: Edmonton Eskimos*
- * Offseason or practice squad member only

Awards and highlights
- National champion (1950)

Bob Lance Ewbank (January 26, 1928 – November 7, 2014) was an American and Canadian football player. He signed with the Edmonton Eskimos in 1953, but did not appear in any games during the season. He previously played college football at the University of Oklahoma and lettered in 1948 and 1952. His hometown was Norman, Oklahoma. He died in 2014.
