= Ray Heffernan (cricketer) =

Australian cricketer and architect

Personal information
- Born: 13 October 1935; Hobart, Tasmania, Australia
- Died: 19 November 2014 (aged 79); Hobart, Tasmania, Australia

Domestic team information
- Years: Team
- 1959—1968: Tasmania
- Source: Cricinfo, 11 March 2016

Ray Heffernan (13 October 1935 – 19 November 2014) was an Australian cricketer and renowned architect. He played ten first-class matches for Tasmania between 1959 and 1968.

== Education ==
Ray graduated from the Hobart Technical College with a Diploma of Architecture in 1959, being awarded the university medallion in his final year.

== Architecture career ==
Heffernan initially formed a working partnership with Graham Martin in the early 1960s before relocating to Perth in 1963 to pursue professional cricket and architecture. He later travelled to London and Toronto before returning to Tasmania in 1967.

He later worked with Bush Parkes Shugg and Moon as a design architect for six years. In the 1970s and 1980s Ray formed partnerships with notable architects on projects such as the Antarctic Division Headquarters, Kingston and the ABC Offices, Hobart. By 1996 the partnerships had evolved into the architecture office of Heffernan Button Voss.

Ray retired in mid–2007 but maintained an ongoing interest in the practice and was closely consulted in the highly regarded restorations and adaptations undertaken on his original Trial Bay House. Some of Ray's notable projects include the Alt-Na-Craig Apartments (1964), Dock of the Bay House, Elizabeth Street Pier, Crematorium in Cornelian Bay, Clarence Council Chambers, Government Offices in Rosny, Silos Apartments in Salamanca Place, and the Bellerive Oval redevelopment.

== Architecture awards ==
Ray Heffernan's architectural projects were awarded a total of 11 Australian Institute of Architects awards, national and state commendations and other industry awards. In 1976 the Clarence Council Chambers in Rosny Park, Hobart was awarded RAIA Tasmania Chapter Triennial Award and was later awarded the 2022 Tasmania Award for Enduring Architecture.

== Recognition ==
Several of Ray's buildings are listed on the Tasmanian Heritage Register, including the Triptree and Barnett Houses in Taroona and the Banks Paton Building in Sandy Bay, Tasmania.

In 2012 Ray was presented with the President's Prize from the Tasmania Chapter of the Australian Institute of Architects for his service to architecture and the profession.

The Australian Institute of Architects Tasmania Chapter recognised him with a Life Fellowship in 2007 and the naming of the Ray Heffernan Award for Residential Architecture, Multiple Housing in 2022.

== See also ==
- List of Tasmanian representative cricketers
