= Javier Azagra Labiano =

His Excellency Javier Azagra Labiano
- Bishop Emeritus of Cartagena
- Church: Roman Catholic Church
- See: Roman Catholic Diocese of Cartagena
- In office: 1978 - 1998
- Predecessor: Miguel Roca Cabanellas
- Successor: Manuel Ureña Pastor
- Previous post: Auxiliary Bishop of Cartagena (1970-1978)

Orders
- Ordination: 23 July 1950
- Consecration: 7 October 1970 by Arturo Tabera Araoz
- Rank: Bishop

Personal details
- Born: 24 January 1923 Pamplona, Spain
- Died: 16 November 2014 (aged 91)
- Coat of arms

Javier Azagra Labiano (24 January 1923 – 16 November 2014) was a Spanish Prelate of the Catholic Church.

Labiano was born in Pamplona, Spain and ordained a priest on 23 July 1950. He was appointed auxiliary bishop of the Diocese of Cartagena, as well as titular bishop of Lacubaza on 17 July 1970 and ordained on 8 October 1970. He was appointed bishop of the Diocese of Cartagena on 23 September 1978 and retired from the post on 20 February 1998. He died on 16 November 2014.
