= Fred Doty =

Canadian football player

Profile
- Position: Quarterback

Personal information
- Born: October 25, 1924; Toronto, Ontario, Canada
- Died: November 9, 2014 (aged 90); Toronto, Ontario, Canada
- Listed height: 5 ft 7 in (1.70 m)
- Listed weight: 152 lb (69 kg)

Career history
- 1945, 1947–1949: Toronto Argonauts

Awards and highlights
- Grey Cup champion (1945, 1947)

Frederick Kenneth "Scooter" Doty (October 25, 1924 – November 9, 2014) was a Canadian professional football player who played for the Toronto Argonauts. He won the Grey Cup with them in 1945, 1946 and 1947. He is a member of the Mississauga Sports Hall of Fame. Doty died of bladder cancer on November 9, 2014, aged 90.
