= Trevor Brown (cricketer, born 1933) =

South African cricketer (1933–2014)

Personal information
- Born: 21 August 1933; Cathcart, Eastern Cape, South Africa
- Died: 3 November 2014 (aged 81); Cathcart, Eastern Cape, South Africa
- Source: Cricinfo, 1 April 2016

Trevor Brown (21 August 1933 – 3 November 2014) was a South African cricketer. He played two first-class matches for Border in 1952/53.
