= Martha S. Hearron =

American biostatistician

Martha Sommerfeld Hearron
- Born: Martha L. Sommerfeld; April 4, 1943; Highland Park, Illinois
- Died: November 29, 2014 (aged 71)
- Education: University of Michigan
- Occupation: Biostatistician
- Spouse: Arthur E. Hearron Jr.

Martha Sommerfeld Hearron (April 4, 1943 – November 29, 2014) was an American biostatistician who worked for over 30 years at Upjohn, becoming the first professional woman and the first female manager there.

Martha L. Sommerfeld was born in Highland Park, Illinois. She was part of the entering class of 1964 at the Woman's College of the University of North Carolina (now the University of North Carolina at Greensboro) but graduated in 1964, with a bachelor's degree in chemistry, from the University of Michigan. She completed her education with a master's degree in public health in 1966, specializing in biostatistics, at the University of Michigan. She married Arthur E. Hearron Jr., and joined Upjohn, where she would work for another 32 years. She helped establish the Pharmaceutical Subsection of the American Statistical Association in 1968 (now the Biopharmaceutical Section), and was its chair in 1976.

In 1988, Hearron was elected as a Fellow of the American Statistical Association.

Hearron held a lifelong interest in the fine and performing arts, and sang soprano in the annual production of Handel's Messiah as part of the University Choral Union at the University of Michigan while she was a student there. As a parting gift from her estate, she funded an endowed chair in fine arts at Western Michigan University, in the names of her and her husband.
