= Ernest W. Johnson =

Ernest W. Johnson MD (12 January 1924 – 18 November 2014) was an American physiatrist and electromyographer. He served as founding Chair of the department of Physical Medicine and Rehabilitation at the Ohio State University from 1963 to 1989. His numerous honors include the Frank H. Krusen, MD, Lifetime Achievement Award (1984) from the American Academy of Physical Medicine and Rehabilitation.
