= Ernie =

Ernie is a masculine given name, frequently a short form (hypocorism) of Ernest, Ernald, Ernesto, or Verner. It may refer to:

== People ==
- Ernie Accorsi (born 1941), American football executive
- Ernie Adams (disambiguation)
- Ernie Afaganis (born c. 1933), Canadian sports announcer
- Ernie Althoff (born 1950), Australian musician and composer
- Ernie Anastos (born 1943), American television journalist
- Ernie Anderson (1923–1997), American radio and television announcer
- Ernie Ashcroft (1925–1985), English rugby league footballer
- Ernie Ball (1930–2004), American guitarist and businessman
- Ernie Banks (1931–2015), American baseball player
- Ernie Barbarash, American film producer
- Ernie Barnes (1938–2009), American football player and painter
- Ernie Blenkinsop (1902–1969), English footballer
- Ernie Boch Jr. (born 1958), American billionaire businessman
- Ernie Bond (disambiguation)
- Ernie Bridge (1936–2013), Australian politician
- Ernie Broglio (1935–2019), American baseball pitcher
- Ernie Bushmiller (1905–1982), American cartoonist
- Ernie Calcutt (1932–1984), Canadian sports commentator and radio news director
- Ernie Calloway (born 1948), American football player
- Ernie Clement (born 1996), American baseball player
- Ernie Colón (1931–2019), American comics artist
- Ernie Coombs (1927–2001), Canadian entertainer
- Ernie Cox (Canadian football) (1894–1962), Canadian football player
- Ernie Danjean (1934–1995), American football player
- Ernie Davis (1939–1963), American football player
- Ernie Dickerman (1910–1998), American conservationist
- Ernie DiGregorio (born 1951), American basketball player
- Ernie Dingo (born 1956), Australian actor and television personality
- Ernie Dodd (1880–1918), New Zealand rugby union player
- Ernie Dubeau (1880–1951), Canadian ice hockey player
- Ernie Duplechin, American football and baseball player and football coach
- Ernie Els (born 1969), South African golfer
- Ernie Ernst (1924/25–2013), American district attorney and jurist
- Ernie Fixmer (born 1977), American drifting driver
- Ernie Fletcher (born 1952), American physician and politician, 60th Governor of Kentucky
- Tennessee Ernie Ford (1919–1991), American singer
- Ernie Graham (1946–2001), Northern Irish singer and songwriter
- Ernie Green (born 1938), American football player
- Ernie Grunfeld (born 1955), American basketball player and executive
- Ernie Hammes (born 1968), Luxembourgish jazz trumpeter
- Ernie Hardeman (born 1947), Canadian politician
- Ernie Hart (1910–1985), American comics artist and writer
- Ernie Harwell (1918–2010), American sports announcer
- Ernie Hawkins (born 1947), American blues singer and musician
- Ernie Henry (1926–1957), American jazz saxophonist
- Ernie Hine (1901–1974), English footballer
- Ernie Hughes (born 1955), American football player
- Ernie Hudson (born 1945), American actor
- Ernie Isley (born 1952), American singer and musician
- Ernie Isley (politician) (born 1937), Canadian politician
- Ernie Jennings (born 1949), American football player
- Ernie Johnson (disambiguation)
- Ernie Jones (disambiguation)
- Ernie Kovacs (1919–1962), American comedian, actor and writer
- Ernie Lombardi (1908–1977), American baseball player
- Ernie Maresca (1938–2015), American singer-songwriter
- Ernie McLean (politician), Canadian politician
- Ernie Merrick (born 1953), Scottish-Australian football manager
- Ernie Mims, stage name of Ernest Christoper Memos (1932–2019), American television personality
- Ernie Morgan (1927–2013), English football player and manager
- Ernie Nevers (1902–1976), American football and baseball player and college football head coach
- Ernie Newton (disambiguation)
- Ernie Nordli (1912–1968), American animation artist and graphic designer
- Ernie Odoom, Swiss jazz musician and vocalist
- Ernie O'Malley (1897–1957), Irish Republican Army officer and writer
- Ernie Oravetz (1932–2006), American baseball player
- Ernie O'Rourke (1926–2024), Australian rules footballer
- Ernie Orsatti (1902–1968), American baseball player
- Ernie Otten (born 1954), American politician
- Ernie Ovitz (1885–1980), American baseball player
- Ernie Padgett (1899–1957), American baseball player
- Ernie Parker (1883–1918), Australian tennis player and cricketer
- Ernie Phythian (1942–2020), English former footballer
- Ernie Pitts (1935–1970), Canadian football player
- Ernie Preate (born 1940), American attorney and politician
- Ernie Price (1950–2004), American football player
- Ernie Price (English footballer) (1926–2013)
- Ernie Pyle (1900–1945), American journalist and war correspondent
- Ernie Rea (born 1945), Northern Irish radio presenter
- Ernie Regehr, Canadian pacifist
- Ernie Reid (c.1905 – c.1938), Australian rugby union player
- Ernie Renzel (1907–2007), American politician
- Ernie Reyes Jr. (born 1972), American actor and martial artist
- Ernie Reyes Sr. (born 1947), American martial artist, actor, and fight choreographer
- Ernie Rice (1896–1979), English boxer and actor
- Ernie Richardson (curler) (born 1931), Canadian curler
- Ernie Richardson (footballer) (1916–1977), English footballer
- Ernie Roberts (1912–1994), English politician and trade unionist
- Ernie Robson (1870–1924), English cricketer
- Ernie Roth (1926–1983), American professional wrestler and wrestling manager
- Ernie Royal (1921–1983), American jazz trumpeter
- Ernie Sabella (born 1949), American actor
- Ernie Schaaf (1908–1933), American boxer
- Ernie Schroeder (1916–2006), American comics artist
- Ernie Schunke (1882–1922), Australian rules footballer
- Ernie Shore (1891–1980), American baseball pitcher
- Ernie Sigley (1938–2021), Australian radio and television personality
- Ernie Sims (born 1984), American football player
- Ernie Smith (disambiguation)
- Ernie Stautner (1925–2006), American football player and coach
- Ernie Steury (1930–2002), American physician and missionary
- Ernie Stierly (1930–2010), American racing driver
- Ernie Suggs (born 1967), American journalist
- Ernie Walker (baseball) (1890–1965), American baseball player
- Ernie Walker (football) (1928–2011), Scottish football administrator
- Ernie Watts (born 1945), American jazz and R&B saxophonist
- Ernie Watts (Small Heath footballer), English footballer who played for Small Heath (188–1890)
- Ernie Watts (footballer, born 1872) (1872–?), English footballer
- Ernie Whitchurch (1891–1957), English footballer
- Ernie White (1916–1974), American baseball pitcher
- Ernie White (Canadian football) (born 1938), American-born Canadian football player
- Ernie Whiteside (1889–1953), English footballer
- Ernie Whitt (born 1952), American baseball player
- Ernie Whittam (1911–1951), English footballer
- Ernie Whittle (1925–1998), English footballer
- Ernie Wiggs (c.1940–2014), New Zealand rugby league footballer
- Ernie Wilkins (1919–1999), American jazz saxophonist
- Ernie Willett (1919–1985), English footballer
- Ernie Williamson (1922–2002), American football player and coach
- Ernie Winchester (1944–2013), Scottish footballer
- Ernie Wise, stage name of English comedian Ernest Wiseman (1925–1999), half of the comedy duo Morecambe and Wise
- Ernie Woerner (1905–1972), American football player
- Ernie Wolf (1889–1964), American baseball pitcher
- Ernie Wright (1939–2007), American football player
- Ernie Wright (footballer) (1912–?), English footballer

== Fictional characters ==
- Ernie (Sesame Street), a Muppet on the TV show Sesame Street
- Ernie the Giant Chicken, on the TV series Family Guy
- Ernie Cardenas, on the TV series George Lopez
- Ernie Macmillan, in the Harry Potter novels by J. K. Rowling
- Ernie Pantusso, also known as "Coach", on the TV show Cheers
- Evil Ernie, a comics character created by Brian Pulido and Steven Hughes
- Ernie Smuntz, from Mouse Hunt

== Technology ==
- Ernie Bot

== See also ==
- Erne (disambiguation)
- Erni, a given name and surname
- Erny (disambiguation) § People
