= Ern (given name) =

Ern is a given name, often a shortened form of Ernest.

People with this name include:

== Sport ==
=== Australian rules football ===
- Ern Cowley (1892 - 1975)
- Ern Elliott (1900 - ???)
- Ern Henfry (1921 - 2007)
- Ern Hocking (1882 - ???)
- Ern Jenkins (1879 – 1927)
- Ern McIntyre (1921 - 2003)
- Ern O'Regan (1907 - ???)
- Ern Penrose (1884 - ???)
- Ern Rowarth (born 1926)
- Ern Utting (1897 - 1948)

=== Other sports ===
- Ern Wilmot (1898 - 1988), Australian rugby league player

== Others ==
- Ern Baxter (1914 - 1993), Canadian Pentecostal evangelist
- Ern Condon, Canadian politician
- Ern Klauer (1870 - 1915), South African engineer, trades-unionist, and politician
- Ern Pedler (1914 - 1989), horseman and writer
- Ern Westmore (1904 - 1967), Hollywood make-up artist and actor

Fictional characters include:

== Fictional characters ==
- Ern Malley, fictitious poet invented as a hoax
- Ern Marks, main character on Atlanta

== See also ==
- Ernest
- Ernie
- Ernie (disambiguation)
