= Erni =

Male given name and family name

Erni is both a given name, often a short form of Ernest, and a surname. Notable people with the name include:

== Given name or nickname ==
- Erni Arneson (1917–2006), Danish actress
- Erni Cabat (1914–1994), American artist
- Erni Gregorčič (born 1976), Slovenian powerlifter
- Erni Hiir (1900–1989), Estonian poet and translator
- Erni Krusten (1900–1984), Estonian writer
- Erni Maissen (born 1958), Swiss footballer
- Erni Mangold (1927–2026), Austrian actress and stage director born Erna Goldmann
- Erni Singerl, actress who played Erni Käslinger, one of the main characters of Heidi und Erni, a German 1990 television series

== Surname ==
- Barbara Erni (1743–1785), Liechtenstein thief, the last person to be executed by Liechtenstein
- Hans Erni (1909–2015), Swiss graphic designer, painter, illustrator, engraver and sculptor
- Lorenz Erni (born 1950), Swiss lawyer

== See also ==
- Ernie (disambiguation)
