= Sug (disambiguation) =

Sug was a Japanese rock band founded in 2006.

Sug may also refer to:

- Sulu (also spelled sug), an autonomous island province of the Philippines
- Surg, Birjand, South Khorasan Province, Iran, a village also known as Sūg
- Sug Cornelius (1906–1968), American baseball pitcher in the Negro leagues
- Sug Daniels, American singer-songwriter and musician
- SUG, IATA code for Surigao Airport, Philippines
- sug, ISO 639-3 code for the Suganga language, spoken in New Guinea

== See also ==
- Sugg, surname
- Suggs (born 1961), English singer
- Suggs (surname)
