= Suggs (surname) =

Suggs is a surname. Notable people with the surname include:

- A. J. Suggs (born 1980), American college football player
- Brad Suggs (born 1933), American singer songwriter
- Colby Suggs (born 1991), American baseball player and coach
- Don Suggs (1945–2019), American artist
- Eliza Suggs (1876–1908), American author
- Ernie Suggs (born 1967), American journalist
- George Suggs (1882–1949), American baseball player
- Jalen Suggs (born 2001), American basketball player
- Jay'viar Suggs, American football player
- Josh Suggs (born 1989), American soccer player
- Lee Suggs (born 1980), American football player
- Louise Suggs (1923–2015), American golfer
- Matt Suggs, American indie rock musician
- Ralph E. Suggs (born 1947), retired US Navy rear admiral
- Robert Carl Suggs (1932–2021), American archaeologist
- Shafer Suggs (born 1953), American football player
- Terrell Suggs (born 1982), American football player
- Tommy Suggs, American football player
- Walter Suggs (1939–2022), retired American football player
- Welch Suggs, American sportswriter

== See also ==
- Marvin Suggs, a Muppets character
- Sugg, a surname
