= Ern =

Ern or ERN may refer to:

== Transport ==
- Eirunepé Airport, in Brazil
- Engenho da Rainha Station, on the Rio de Janeiro Metro
- Ernakulam Town railway station, in Kerala, India
- Ernest Airlines, an Italian airline

== Other uses ==
- Elizabeth Reid Network, an Australian network for women in politics
- Employer Reference Number, an identifier in the UK tax system
- Erin Energy Corporation, an American oil and gas company
- Eritrean nakfa, the currency of Eritrea
- Ern (given name)
- Error-related negativity, a component of an event-related potential in an electroencephalograph
- Sea eagle, any bird of prey in the genus Haliaeetus
  - White-tailed eagle (H. albicilla)

== See also ==
- Erne (disambiguation)
- Erna (disambiguation)
