= Charles Rees =

British chemist (1927–2006)

Charles Rees CBE FRS FRSC
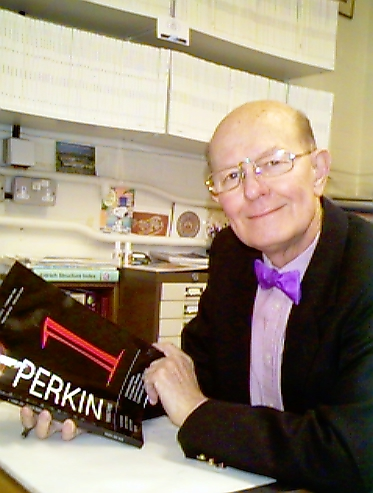
- Prof Charles W. Rees
- Born: Charles Wayne Rees; 15 October 1927; Egypt
- Died: 21 September 2006 (aged 78)
- Citizenship: British
- Awards: CBE FRS (1974) FRSC

Charles Wayne Rees (15 October 1927 – 21 September 2006) was a British organic chemist.

== Early life and education ==
Rees was born in Egypt, and educated in England at Farnham Grammar School. After three years as a laboratory technician at the Royal Aircraft Establishment he went to University College at Southampton (later the University of Southampton) where he graduated in 1950. He took his PhD there with Professor A. Albert of the Australian National University – at Euston Road, London.

== Career ==
He was then appointed Assistant Lecturer at Birkbeck College, London in 1955 (moving in at the bottom as Professor Derek Barton moved out at the top to take up the Regius Chair in Glasgow). After two years at Birkbeck, Rees moved to King's College London where he spent eight years as Lecturer/Reader.

He collaborated for several years with Professor Donald Holroyde Hey on various aspects of heterocyclic chemistry. He was appointed to his first Chair at the University of Leicester in 1965, and four years later moved to the University of Liverpool as Professor of Organic Chemistry, and in 1977 he succeeded Professor George Wallace Kenner there as Heath Harrison Professor of Organic Chemistry. In 1978, he was appointed Hofmann Professor of Organic Chemistry at Imperial College London and remained there until his retirement in 1993.

Rees' research interests ranged widely over mechanistic and synthetic organic chemistry. Much of his work was concerned with heterocyclic chemistry, particularly the synthesis and chemistry of new heterocyclic rings, with an emphasis on aromatic and antiaromatic rings, and the role of reactive intermediates in heterocyclic chemistry. Recently, he had been working on heterocyclic systems with unusually high proportions of nitrogen and sulphur heteroatoms. He published about 480 papers in the scientific literature.

Rees was the President of the Royal Society of Chemistry from July 1992 for two years. He has served on its Council and many Boards and Committees at various times; he was Chair of the Publication and Information Board for four years. He was President of the Perkin Division of the RSC, and President of the Chemistry Association for the Advancement of Science.

Amongst the many and diverse contributions to chemistry he made, his two papers describing the brilliantly conceived generation of benzyne and [1,8]-dehydronaphthalene by the lead(IV) acetate oxidation of N-amino heterocycles are considered classic papers from this era.

He died on 21 September 2006 of undisclosed causes.

== Awards and honours ==
He was the Royal Society of Chemistry's Tilden Lecturer in 1974, and the Pedler Lecturer in 1984, and received the (first) RSC Award in Heterocyclic Chemistry in 1980 and the International award in Heterocyclic Chemistry in 1995. He was elected a Fellow of the Royal Society (FRS) in 1974. He was awarded an Honorary D.Sc. by the University of Leicester in 1994 and a CBE in the New Years Honours list in 1995.
