= Pedler =

Pedler is an Anglo-Saxon occupational surname originating from the term peddler.

== Notable persons with the surname ==
- Alexander Pedler (1849–1918), British civil servant and chemist.
- Ern Pedler (1914–1989), Australian-born American writer.
- John Pedler (1870–1942), Australian politician.
- Kit Pedler (1927–1981), British medical scientist, parapsychologist and science fiction author.
- Margaret Pedler (1877–1948), British novelist.
