= Mariša Golob =

Slovenian powerlifter

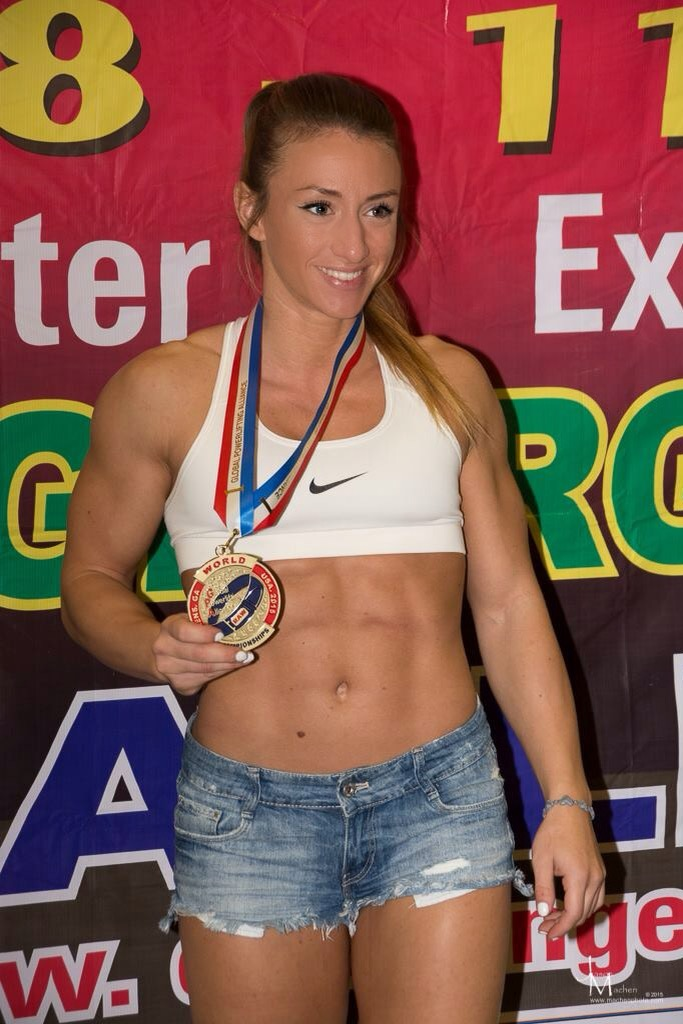
- Mariša Golob at the Worlds 2015 in Athens Georgia

Personal information
- Full name: Mariša Golob
- Born: May 15, 1990 (age 36) Ljubljana, Slovenia
- Occupation(s): law student, powerlifter
- Years active: 2012–present
- Height: 1.56 m (5 ft 1 in)
- Weight: 52 kg (115 lb)

Sport
- Country: Slovenia
- Sport: Powerlifting
- Weight class: -52kg, −56 kg, −60 kg, −67,5 kg
- Event(s): Powerlifting, bench press, push & pull, deadlift
- Coached by: Erni Gregorčič
Medal record
Women's Powerliftting
Representing Slovenia
International powerlifting competitions
Event	1st	2nd	3rd
World Championships	22	1	0
European Championships	20	0	0
Total	42	1	0
- Updated on 28 December 2018

Mariša Golob (born 15 May 1990) is the most successful and decorated female in Slovenian powerlifting history.

Medal record

Women's Powerlifting – raw

Representing Slovenia

World Championship
Gold medal – first place	2013 GPA Tampere	Powerlifting
Gold medal – first place	2014 WUAP Telfs	Powerlifting
Silver medal – second place	2014 GPA Sydney	Powerlifting
Gold medal – first place	2015 GPA Athens	Powerlifting
Gold medal – first place	2016 WUAP Herzberg	Powerlifting
Gold medal – first place	2016 GPA Moscow	Powerlifting
Gold medal – first place	2017 WUAP Prague	Powerlifting
Gold medal – first place	2018 WPA Lutsk	Powerlifting
Gold medal – first place	2018 WUAP Trnava	Powerlifting
Gold medal – first place	2018 IPL Saint Petersburg	Powerlifting

European Championship
Gold medal – first place	2012 GPC Bled	Powerlifting
Gold medal – first place	2014 GPA Kyiv	Powerlifting
Gold medal – first place	2014 GPA Tbilisi	Powerlifting
Gold medal – first place	2015 WUAP Prague	Powerlifting
Gold medal – first place	2016 GPA Zadar	Powerlifting
Gold medal – first place	2016 WUAP Gyula	Powerlifting
Gold medal – first place	2017 WUAP Telfs	Powerlifting
Gold medal – first place	2018 WPC Le Pont-de-Claix	Powerlifting

Medal record

Women's Benchpress – raw

Representing Slovenia

World Championship
Gold medal – first place	2013 GPA Tampere	Bench press
Gold medal – first place	2014 WUAP Telfs	Bench press
Gold medal – first place	2014 GPA Sydney	Bench press
Gold medal – first place	2015 GPA Athens	Bench press
Gold medal – first place	2018 IPL Saint Petersburg	Bench press

European Championship
Gold medal – first place	2012 GPC Bled	Bench press
Gold medal – first place	2014 GPA Kyiv	Bench press
Gold medal – first place	2015 GPA Tbilisi	Bench press

Medal record

Women's Powerlifting – equipped

Representing Slovenia

World Championship
Gold medal – first place	2013 WUAP Eilenburg	Powerlifting

European Championship
Gold medal – first place	2013 WUAP Trnava	Powerlifting
Gold medal – first place	2014 WUAP Prešov	Powerlifting

Medal record

Women's Benchpress – equipped

Representing Slovenia

World Championship
Gold medal – first place	2012 GPC Bardejov	Bench press
Gold medal – first place	2013 WUAP Eilenburg	Bench press

European Championship
Gold medal – first place	2013 WUAP Trnava	Bench press
Gold medal – first place	2014 IPO Kyiv	Bench press
Gold medal – first place	2014 WUAP Prešov	Bench press
Gold medal – first place	2015 WUAP Prague	Powerlifting
Gold medal – first place	2016 IPO Zadar	Bench press

Medal record

Women's Push&Pull

Representing Slovenia

World Championship
Gold medal – first place	2014 GPA Sydney	Push&Pull
Gold medal – first place	2015 GPA Athens	Push&Pull
Gold medal – first place	2016 GPA Moscow	Push&Pull
Gold medal – first place	2018 IPL Saint Petersburg	Push&Pull

European Championship
Gold medal – first place	2015 GPA Tbilisi	Push&Pull

Medal record

Women's Deadlift

Representing Slovenia

World Championship
Gold medal – first place	2014 GPA Sydney	Deadlift
Gold medal – first place	2015 GPA Athens	Deadlift
Gold medal – first place	2018 WPA Lutsk	Deadlift
Gold medal – first place	2018 WUAP Trnava	Deadlift
Gold medal – first place	2018 IPL Saint Petersburg	Deadlift

European Championship
Gold medal – first place	2015 GPA Tbilisi	Deadlift

Medal record

Women's Squat

Representing Slovenia

World Championship
Gold medal – first place	2016 GPA Moscow	Squat

== Career ==
Throughout her younger years Mariša Golob competed in karate, artistic gymnastics and basketball. In 2011, she joined a local gym and met her current coach Erni Gregorčič. He saw her potential and introduced her to powerlifting. In 2012, she began to compete internationally and since then won more than 25 World and European Championship titles in powerlifting, bench press, push&pull and deadlift.

She is the current national, European and world record holder in many different powerlifting federations (GPA, WUAP, IPO, WPA). She is participating and competing in two powerlifting federations, WUAP and GPA.

== Personal records ==
Official powerlifting competition records (raw - sleeves):

Squat	140 kg
Bench press	100 kg
Deadlift	172,5 kg
Total	402,5 kg

Official powerlifting competition records (raw - wraps):

Squat	162,5 kg
Bench press	100 kg
Deadlift	172,5 kg
Total	427,5 kg

Official powerlifting competition records (equipped):

Squat	152,5 kg
Bench press	105 kg
Deadlift	142,5 kg
Total	400 kg

Official bench press competition record (raw):

Bench press	97,5 kg

Official bench press competition record (equipped):

Bench press	120 kg

Official push&pull competition records (raw) :

Bench press	97,5 kg
Deadlift	172,5 kg
Total	262,5 kg

Official deadlift competition record (raw) :

Deadlift	172,5 kg

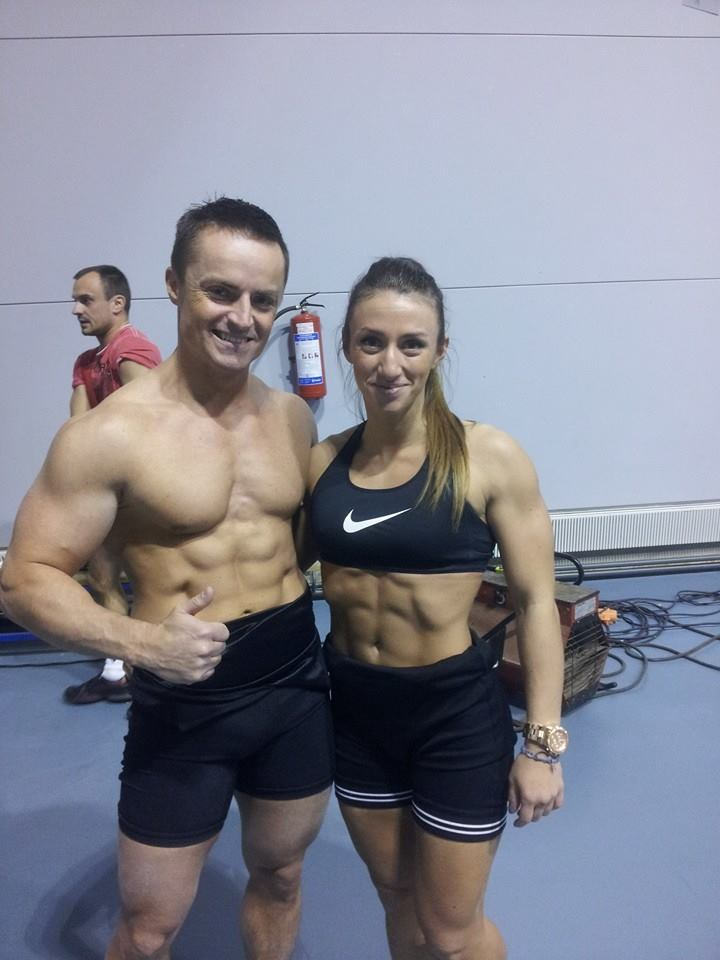
Mariša Golob with her coach Erni Gregorčič after competition at the Worlds 2013 in Tampere, Finland

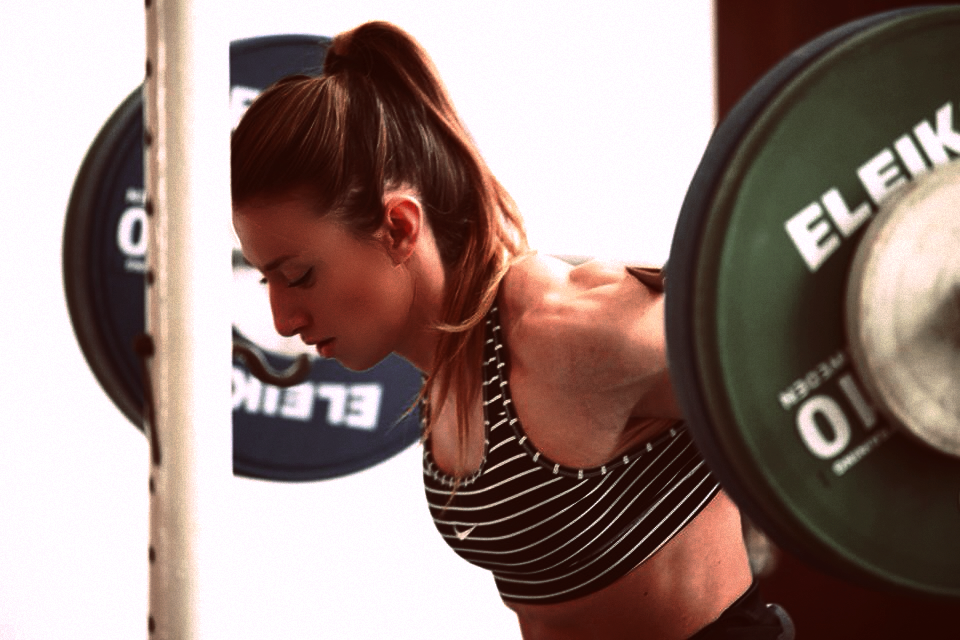
Mariša Golob warming up at the 2015 European Championship in Tbilisi, Georgia

== National, European and World records ==
=== National records ===
Mariša is the current Slovenian powerlifting, bench press, push&pull and deadlift record holder in −56 kg weight class in junior and open category.

=== European records ===
Mariša holds the current GPA European record powerlifting in −56 kg, open category.

=== World records ===
At the moment Mariša is a GPA push&pull World record holder in −56 kg, open category and bench press World record holder in −56 kg, junior category. She is also the current IPO World record holder in equipped bench press in −56 kg weight class, both junior and open category. In WUAP federation she is also the holder of the raw powerlifting World record in −56 kg and -52 kg weight class, open category, equipped bench press −56 kg weight class, open category and equipped bench press −60 kg weight class, junior category. In the same federation she also holds equipped powerlifting World records in both −56 kg and −60 kg weight class, junior category. In May 2018 Mariša became squat (full meet), bench press (full meet) and total WPA world record holder in open -56 kg class.

== World and European Championships ==
Place	Championships	Date	Location	Event	Type	Weight class	Category
1	GPC European Championships	14–19 May 2012	Bled, Slovenia	Powerlifting	raw	−60 kg	junior
1	GPC European Championships	14–19 May 2012	Bled, Slovenia	Bench press	raw	−60 kg	junior
1	GPC World Championships	17–22 Sep 2012	Bardejov, Slovakia	Bench press	equipped	−67,5 kg	junior
1	WUAP European Championships	12–15 Jun 2013	Trnava, Slovakia	Powerlifting	equipped	−60 kg	junior
1	WUAP European Championships	12–15 Jun 2013	Trnava, Slovakia	Bench press	equipped	−60 kg	junior
1	WUAP World Championships	25–28 Sep 2013	Eilenburg, Germany	Powerlifting	equipped	−56 kg	junior
1	WUAP World Championships	25–28 Sep 2013	Eilenburg, Germany	Bench press	equipped	−56 kg	junior
1	GPA World Championships	5–8 Dec 2013	Tampere, Finland	Powerlifting	raw	−56 kg	junior
1	GPA World Championships	5–8 Dec 2013	Tampere, Finland	Bench press	raw	−56 kg	junior
1	GPA European Championships	4–5 May 2014	Kyiv, Ukraine	Powerlifting	raw	−56 kg	junior
1	GPA European Championships	4–5 May 2014	Kyiv, Ukraine	Bench press	raw	−56 kg	junior
1	IPO European Championships	4–5 May 2014	Kyiv, Ukraine	Bench press	equipped	−56 kg	junior
1	WUAP European Championships	13–14 Jun 2014	Prešov, Slovakia	Powerlifting	equipped	−56 kg	open
1	WUAP European Championships	13–14 Jun 2014	Prešov, Slovakia	Bench press	equipped	−56 kg	open
1	WUAP World Championships	7–11 Oct 2014	Telfs, Austria	Powerlifting	raw	−56 kg	open
1	WUAP World Championships	7–11 Oct 2014	Telfs, Austria	Bench press	raw	−56 kg	open
2	GPA World Championships	21–24 Nov 2014	(Australia) Sydney	Powerlifting	raw	−56 kg	open
1	GPA World Championships	21–24 Nov 2014	(Australia) Sydney	Bench press	raw	−56 kg	open
1	GPA World Championships	21–24 Nov 2014	(Australia) Sydney	Deadlift	raw	−56 kg	open
1	GPA World Championships	21–24 Nov 2014	(Australia) Sydney	Push&Pull	raw	−56 kg	open
1	GPA European Championships	24–26 Apr 2015	(Georgia (country)) Tbilisi, Georgia	Powerlifting	raw	−56 kg	open
1	GPA European Championships	24–26 Apr 2015	(Georgia (country)) Tbilisi, Georgia	Bench press	raw	−56 kg	open
1	GPA European Championships	24–26 Apr 2015	(Georgia (country)) Tbilisi, Georgia	Deadlift	raw	−56 kg	open
1	GPA European Championships	24–26 Apr 2015	(Georgia (country)) Tbilisi, Georgia	Push&Pull	raw	−56 kg	open
1	WUAP European Championships	16–20 Jun 2015	Prague, Czech Republic	Powerlifting	raw	−56 kg	open
1	WUAP European Championships	16–20 Jun 2015	Prague, Czech Republic	Bench press	equipped	−56 kg	open
1	GPA World Championships	8–11 Oct 2015	Athens, Georgia, United States	Powerlifting	raw	−56 kg	open
1	GPA World Championships	8–11 Oct 2015	Athens, Georgia, United States	Bench press	raw	−56 kg	open
1	GPA World Championships	8–11 Oct 2015	Athens, Georgia, United States	Deadlift	raw	−56 kg	open
1	GPA World Championships	8–11 Oct 2015	Athens, Georgia, United States	Push&Pull	raw	−56 kg	open
1	GPA European Championships	27–29 May 2016	Zadar, Croatia	Powerlifting	raw	−56 kg	open
1	IPO European Championships	27–29 May 2016	Zadar, Croatia	Bench press	equipped	−56 kg	open
1	WUAP European Championships	15–18 June 2016	Gyula, Hungary	Powerlifting	raw	−56 kg	open
1	WUAP World Championships	4–11 Oct 2016	Herzberg, Germany	Powerlifting	raw	−56 kg	open
1	GPA World Championships	8–11 Dec 2016	Moscow, Russia	Powerlifting	raw	−56 kg	open
1	GPA World Championships	8–11 Dec 2016	Moscow, Russia	Squat	raw	−56 kg	open
1	GPA World Championships	8–11 Dec 2016	Moscow, Russia	Push&Pull	raw	−56 kg	open
1	WUAP European Championships	12–17 June 2017	Telfs, Austria	Powerlifting	raw	−52 kg	open
1	WUAP World Championships	17–22 October 2017	Prague, Czech Republic	Powerlifting	raw	−52 kg	open
1	WPA World Championships	15–20 May 2018	Lutsk, Ukraine	Powerlifting	raw	−56 kg	open
1	WPA World Championships	15–20 May 2018	Lutsk, Ukraine	Deadlift	raw	−56 kg	open
1	WPC European Championships	23–29 June 2018	Le Pont-de-Claix, France	Powerlifting	raw	−52 kg	open
1	WUAP World Championships	15–21 October 2018	Trnava, Slovakia	Powerlifting	raw	−56 kg	open
1	WUAP World Championships	15–21 October 2018	Trnava, Slovakia	Deadlift	raw	−60 kg	open
1	IPL World Championships	7–9 December 2018	Saint Petersburg, Russia	Powerlifting	raw (sleeves)	−56 kg	open
1	IPL World Championships	7–9 December 2018	Saint Petersburg, Russia	Bench press	raw	−56 kg	open
1	IPL World Championships	7–9 December 2018	Saint Petersburg, Russia	Push&Pull	raw	−56 kg	open
1	IPL World Championships	7–9 December 2018	Saint Petersburg, Russia	Deadlift	raw	−56 kg	open
