= List of fellows of the Royal Society elected in 1974 =

Fellows of the Royal Society elected in 1974.

== Fellows ==
1. Sir Walter Fred Bodmer
2. William Robert Boon
3. Kenneth Burton
4. Hugh John Forster Cairns
5. Sir Roy Yorke Calne
6. David Roderick Curtis
7. John Frank Davidson
8. Jack David Dunitz
9. Pehr Victor Edman
10. John Douglas Eshelby
11. Jack Halpern
12. Stephen William Hawking
13. Volker Heine
14. Robert Aubrey Hinde
15. Albert Edward Litherland
16. James Ephraim Lovelock
17. Richard Ellis Ford Matthews
18. Drummond Hoyle Matthews
19. Peter Dennis Mitchell
20. Samuel Victor Perry
21. Norman James Petch
22. John Robert Philip
23. Sir John Charlton Polkinghorne
24. Charles Wayne Rees
25. John Rishbeth
26. Roger Valentine Short
27. John Trevor Stuart
28. Robert Henry Stewart Thompson
29. Sir John Robert Vane
30. Frederick John Vine
31. Stephen Esslemont Woods
32. Pierre Henry John Young

== Foreign members ==
1. Renato Dulbecco
2. George Herbert Hitchings
3. Giuseppe Paolo Stanislao Occhialini
4. Jean-Pierre Serre

== Statute 12 Fellow ==
1. Sir Vivian Ernest Fuchs
