= Erny =

Erny may refer to:

== People ==
- Elizabeth Erny Foote (born 1953), American lawyer
- Ernie Colón
- Erny Brenner (1931–2016), Luxembourgish football player
- Erny Kirchen (born 1949), Luxembourgish cyclist
- Erny Pinckert (1908–1977), American American football player
- Erny Putz (1917–1995), Luxembourgish fencer
- Erny Schweitzer (born 1939), Luxembourgish swimmer

== Places ==
- Erny Field, United States
- Erny-Saint-Julien, France

== See also ==
- Ernie, given name
- Ernie (disambiguation)
