= John Vane =

British scientist

Sir John Vane
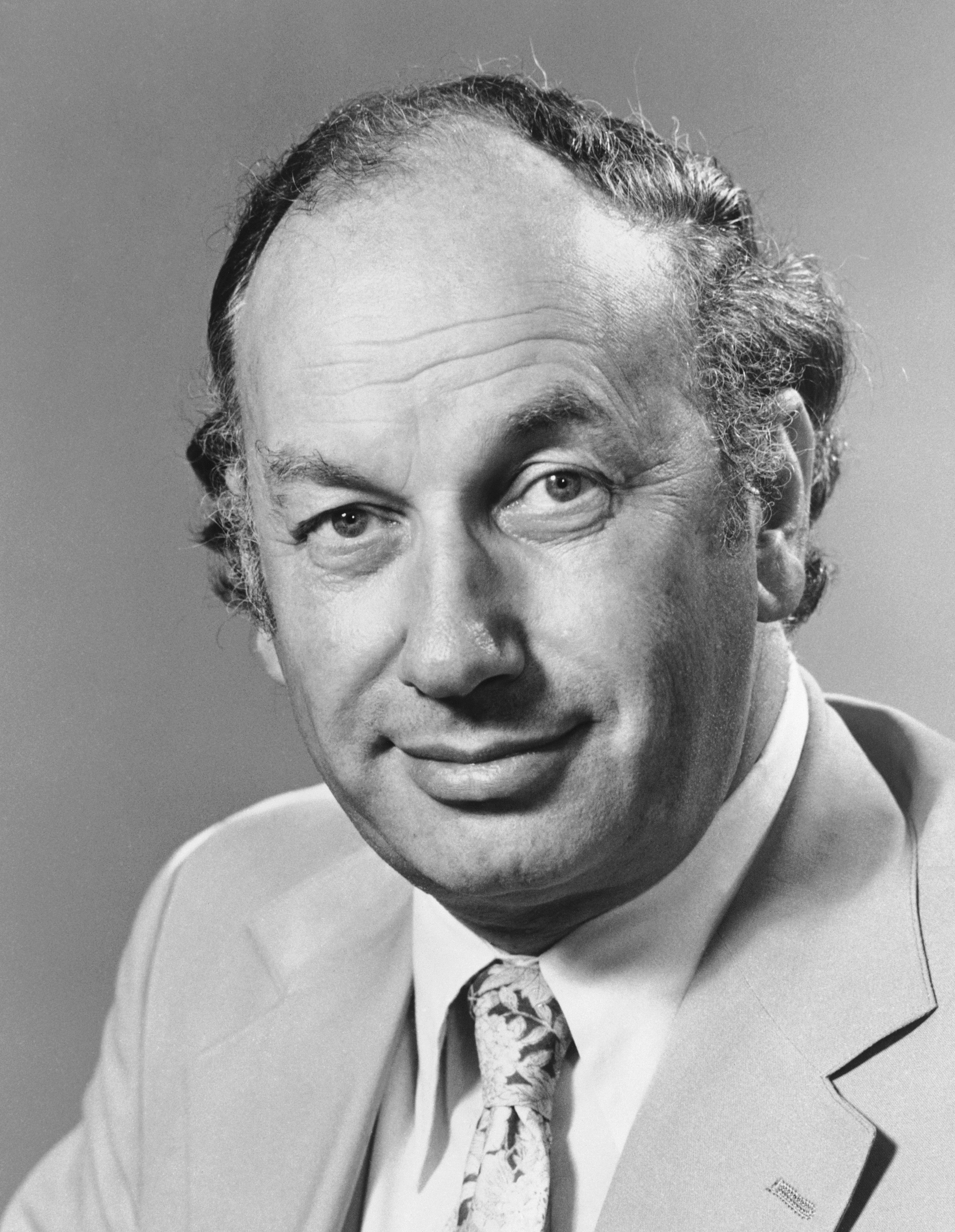
- Born: John Robert Vane; 29 March 1927; Tardebigge, Worcestershire, England
- Died: 19 November 2004 (aged 77); Kent, England
- Citizenship: United Kingdom
- Education: University of Birmingham (BSc); University of Oxford (DPhil)
- Known for: Research on prostaglandins
- Spouse: Elizabeth Daphne Page (m. 1948)
- Awards: FRS (1974); Nobel Prize in Physiology or Medicine (1982); Royal Medal (1989); Lasker Award (1977)
- Scientific career
- Fields: Pharmacology
- Workplaces: University of London; Yale University
- Thesis: Blood flow and its relation to secretion in the stomach and smaller intestine (1952)
- Doctoral advisor: Geoffrey S. Dawes

Sir John Robert Vane FRS (29 March 1927 – 19 November 2004) was a British pharmacologist who was instrumental in the understanding of how aspirin produces pain-relief and anti-inflammatory effects and his work led to new treatments for heart and blood vessel disease and introduction of ACE inhibitors. He was awarded the Nobel Prize in Physiology or Medicine in 1982 along with Sune Bergström and Bengt Samuelsson for "their discoveries concerning prostaglandins and related biologically active substances".

== Education and early life ==
Born in Tardebigge, Worcestershire, John Vane was one of three children and grew up in suburban Birmingham. His father, Maurice Vane, was the son of Jewish Russian immigrants and his mother, Frances Vane, came from a Worcestershire farming family. He attended a local state school from age 5, before moving on to King Edward's School in Edgbaston, Birmingham. An early interest in chemistry was to prove the inspiration for studying the subject at the University of Birmingham in 1944.

During his undergraduate studies, Vane became disenchanted with chemistry but still enjoyed experimentation. When Maurice Stacey, the Professor of Chemistry at Birmingham, was asked by Harold Burn to recommend a student to go to Oxford and study pharmacology, Vane jumped at the chance and moved to Burn's department in 1946. Under Burn's guidance, Vane found motivation and enthusiasm for pharmacology, writing: "[the] laboratory gradually became the most active and important centre for pharmacological research in the U.K. and the main school for training of young pharmacologists." Vane completed a Bachelor of Science degree in pharmacology and briefly went to work at the University of Sheffield, before coming back to Oxford to complete his Doctor of Philosophy degree in 1953 supervised by Geoffrey Dawes.

== Career and research ==
After completing his DPhil, Vane worked as an assistant professor the Department of Pharmacology at Yale University before moving back to the United Kingdom to take up a post as a senior lecturer in the Institute of Basic Medical Sciences at the University of London in 1955.

=== University of London ===
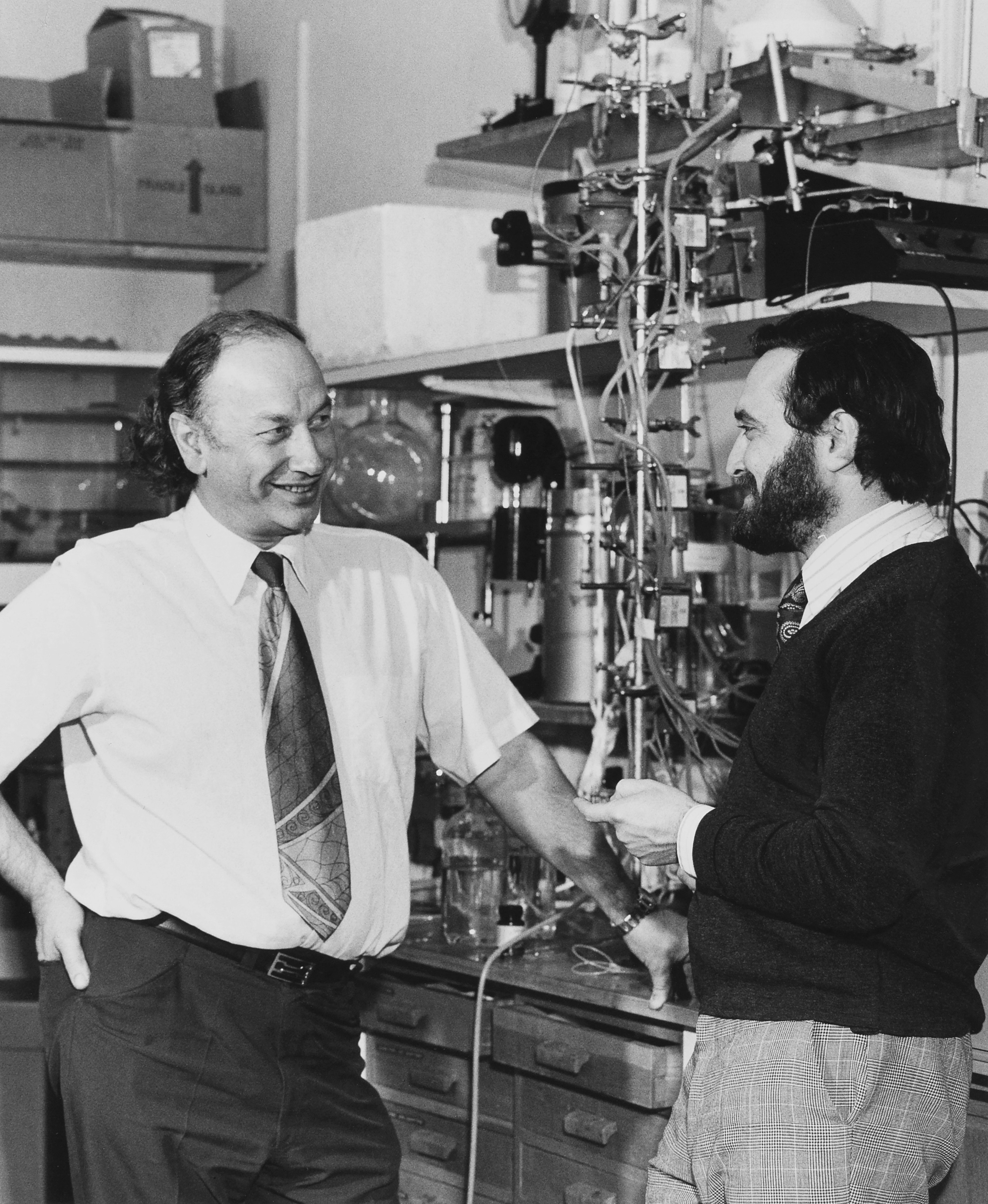
John Vane and Salvador Moncada in the 1960s

Vane held a post at the University of London for 18 years, progressing from senior lecturer to Professor of Experimental Pharmacology in 1966 (at the Royal College of Surgeons). During that time he developed certain bioassay techniques and focussed his research on both angiotensin-converting enzyme and the actions of aspirin, eventually leading to the publication with Priscilla Piper of the relationship between aspirin and the prostaglandins that earned him the Nobel Prize in Physiology or Medicine in 1982.

=== Wellcome Foundation ===
In 1973, Vane left his academic post at the Royal College of Surgeons and took up the position as director of research at the Wellcome Foundation, taking a number of his colleagues with him who went on to form the Prostaglandin Research department. Under the leadership of Salvador Moncada, this group continued important research that eventually led to the discovery of prostacyclin.

=== Return to academia ===
In 1985, Vane returned to academic life and founded the William Harvey Research Institute at the Medical College of St Bartholomew's Hospital (now Barts and The London School of Medicine and Dentistry. At the William Harvey Research Institute, Vane's work focused on selective inhibitors of COX-2, and the interplay between nitric oxide and endothelin in the regulation of vascular function.

== Awards and honours ==
Vane was elected a Fellow of the Royal Society (FRS) in 1974. He was also awarded honorary doctorate degrees from Jagiellonian University Medical College (formerly Copernicus Academy of Medicine) in 1977, Paris Descartes University in 1978, Mount Sinai School of Medicine in 1980, the University of Aberdeen in 1983 and Fu Jen Catholic University in 2011. He was awarded the Lasker Award in 1977 for the discovery of prostacyclin and was knighted in 1984 for his contributions to science. In 2000, Vane received the Golden Plate Award of the American Academy of Achievement.

== Personal life ==
John Vane married, in 1948, (Elizabeth) Daphne Page and had 2 daughters. He died on 19 November 2004 in Princess Royal University Hospital, Kent, from long-term complications arising from leg and hip fractures he sustained in May of that year. Lady Vane died in 2021.

== See also ==
- List of Jewish Nobel laureates
