= Speck Rhodes =

American entertainer (1915–2000)

Gilbert Ray "Speck" Rhodes (July 16, 1915 – March 19, 2000) was an American country music comedian and entertainer.

Speck Rhodes came from a musical family. He and three of his siblings, Slim, Dusty, and Bea, known as The Junior Arkansas Travelers played the RKO Vaudeville theater circuit on the West Coast in the early 1930s. They later became known as The Log Cabin Mountaineers and had a daily radio show on KWOC in Poplar Bluff. Slim played the guitar, Dusty played the fiddle, Bea played the fiddle, mandolin, and accordion, and Speck played the banjo and bass fiddle. While the band was at Poplar Bluff, Speck developed his comic character that served him for the rest of his career.

From 1948 until 1975, the Rhodes brothers had a weekly television program called the Slim Rhodes Show that aired on WMCT Channel 5 in Memphis. Then, in 1960 Speck auditioned for a new television show called The Porter Wagoner Show that the Chattanooga Medicine Company was starting in Nashville. Speck got the job, and because he and Porter both come from West Plains, they had a natural chemistry that resulted in an association lasting over 20 years.

After the Porter Wagoner television show ended, Speck worked alone for a few years until retiring in September 1996. He died at his home in Nashville on March 19, 2000, at age 84. He and his wife Alice are buried at Spring Hill Cemetery in Nashville, Tennessee.
