= Geneva National Golf Club =

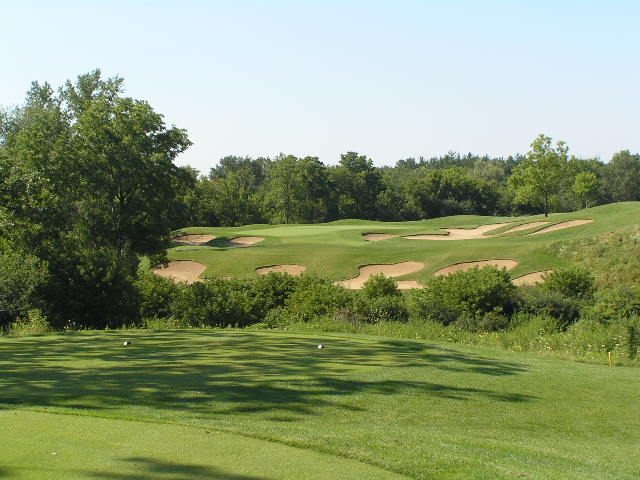

Club information
- Location: Lake Geneva, Wisconsin.
- Established: 1991
- Type: Semi-Private
- Owner: Paloma Geneva National, LLC
- Tota holes: 54
- Tournaments: Aurora Health Care Championship; 2006–2008
- Website: Geneva National Golf Club

Arnold Palmer Signature Course
- Designed by: Arnold Palmer
- Par: 72
- Length: 7,171
- Course rating: 74.7

Gary Player Signature Course
- Designed by: Gary Player
- Par: 72
- Length: 7,008
- Course rating: 74.3

Lee Trevino Signature Course
- Designed by: Lee Trevino
- Par: 72
- Length: 7,120
- Course rating: 74.3

Geneva National Golf Club is a golf course resort in Lake Geneva, Wisconsin. It opened in 1991.

From 2006 to 2008, it hosted the Aurora Health Care Championship.

It has three courses, designed by Arnold Palmer, Gary Player and Lee Trevino respectively.

== Courses ==
- Arnold Palmer Signature Course
- Gary Player Signature Course
- Lee Trevino Signature Course
