= Beth Bauer =

American professional golfer (born 1980)

Personal information
- Full name: Beth Bauer Grace
- Nationality: United States
- Born: March 15, 1980 (age 46) Largo, Florida, U.S.
- Height: 5 ft 8 in (1.73 m)
- Spouse: Andy Grace
- Children: 1

Career
- Sport: Golf
- College: Duke University
- Turned professional: 2000
- Former tours: Futures Tour; LPGA Tour
- Professional wins: 4

Number of wins by tour
- Epson Tour: 4

Best results in LPGA major championships
- Chevron Championship: T16: 1998
- Women's PGA C'ship: T52: 2002
- U.S. Women's Open: T18: 2002
- du Maurier Classic: DNP
- Women's British Open: T8: 2002

Achievements and awards
- LPGA Rookie of the Year: 2002
- Futures Tour Player of the Year: 2001
- Futures Tour Rookie of the Year: 2001

Beth Bauer Grace (born March 15, 1980) is an American professional golfer. She played under the name Beth Bauer.

== Early life and amateur career ==
In 1980, Bauer was born in Largo, Florida. As an amateur, she won the 1997 U.S. Girls' Junior and in 1998 and 1999 she earned back-to-back victories at the North and South Women's Amateur at Pinehurst Resort in North Carolina. She played on the victorious U.S. Curtis Cup team in 1998 and 2000.

A former student at Duke University, where she played on the golf team, she turned professional in 2000. At Duke, she was named the Atlantic Coast Conference (ACC) Rookie of the Year in 1999, an honor that was later awarded to fellow Blue Devils Liz Janangelo (2003), Brittany Lang (2004), Amanda Blumenherst (2006), and Laetitia Beck.

== Professional career ==
She won the player and rookie of the year awards on the developmental Futures Tour in 2001 as she graduated to the LPGA Tour for 2002. She enjoyed further success in her first season on the main tour, finishing in 18th place on the money list and winning the rookie of the year award ahead of Natalie Gulbis.

However, her performances fell away over the following seasons and she lost her place on the LPGA Tour at the end of the 2006 season. She quit playing professional golf at the end of 2007.

== Personal life ==
In March 2008, she met Andy Grace while working at the Heritage Harbor Golf and Country Club while finishing her college degree. They married in November 2010. As of April 2011, she was student-teaching in an elementary school in Florida.

On December 20, 2011, she gave birth to a girl and after being the director of golf at Cypress Run Golf Club for over five years, her family has relocated to Birmingham, Alabama where she still enjoys playing and teaching the game.

== Awards and honors ==
- In 1999, while at Duke University, she was named the Atlantic Coast Conference (ACC) Rookie of the Year.
- In 2001, she earned Futures Tour Rookie of the Year and Player of the Year awards.
- In 2002, she earned LPGA Rookie of the Year award.

== Professional wins (4) ==
=== Futures Tour wins (4) ===
- 2001 California FUTURES Classic, Colorado Women's FUTURES Classic, Aurora Health Care SBC FUTURES Charity Golf Classic, York Newspaper Company FUTURES Classic

== Results in LPGA majors ==
Tournament	1998	1999	2000	2001	2002	2003	2004	2005	2006
Kraft Nabisco Championship	T16LA	CUT	T35			T39	T45		
LPGA Championship					T52	CUT	CUT	CUT	CUT
U.S. Women's Open	CUT	CUT	CUT		T18	T43	CUT		CUT
Women's British Open	–	–	–		T8	63	CUT	CUT	

^The Women's British Open replaced the du Maurier Classic as an LPGA major in 2001.

Top 10
Did not play

LA = Low amateur
CUT = missed the half-way cut
"T" tied
