= Sugg =

Sugg is an English surname. Notable people with the surname include:

- Frank Sugg (1862–1933), English footballer and cricketer
- Joe Sugg (born 1991), English video blogger, brother of Zoella
- LaRee Sugg (born 1971), retired professional golfer from America
- Liz Sugg (born 1977), British politician and life peer
- Walter Sugg (1860–1933), English first-class cricketer
- William Thomas Sugg (1833–1907), British gas lighting engineer
- Zoe Sugg or Zoella (born 1990), English model, video blogger and author, sister of Joe Sugg

== See also ==
- H. B. Sugg High School, K-12 educational institution in Farmville, NC, closed in 1999
- Sugg Clinic, Moderne Art Deco building in Ada, Oklahoma
- Sugg House in Sonora, California; NRHP-listed
- W. D. Sugg Middle School, middle school in West Bradenton, Florida
- Suggs (surname)
