= Ernie (disambiguation) =

Ernie is a masculine given name. It may also refer to:

- Ernie Bot, a large language model developed by Baidu
- ERNIE (Electronic Random Number Indicator Equipment), the Premium Bond computer
- "Ernie (The Fastest Milkman in the West)", a song by Benny Hill
- Ernie Awards, an Australian mock award for sexist behaviour
- Piranha Club, formerly Ernie, a comic strip by Bud Grace
- Ernie, a pseudonym used by the musician Michael Kiske for the Avantasia project The Metal Opera

== See also ==
- Erne (disambiguation)
- Erny (disambiguation)
