= Aurora Health Care Championship =

American women's golf tournament

The Aurora Health Care Championship was an annual United States golf tournament for professional women golfers on the Futures Tour, the LPGA Tour's developmental tour. The event was a part of the Futures Tour's schedule from 1995 to 2003, when it was played in the Milwaukee, Wisconsin area and again from 2006 to 2008, when it has been played at the Geneva National Golf Club in Lake Geneva, Wisconsin.

The title sponsor was Aurora Health Care, a Wisconsin-based health care provider.

The Tournament was a 54-hole event, as are most Futures Tour tournaments, and included pre-tournament pro-am opportunities, in which local amateur golfers can play with the professional golfers from the Tour as a benefit for local charities. Benefiting charities from the Aurora Health Care Championship were The Geneva National Foundation and Aurora Health Care.

Tournament names through the years:

- 1995–1999: Aurora Health Care Futures Classic
- 2000: Aurora Health Care Futures Charity Golf Classic
- 2001: Aurora Health Care SBC Futures Charity Golf Classic
- 2002–2003: Aurora Health Care Futures Charity Golf Classic
- 2006–2008: Aurora Health Care Championship

== Winners ==
Year	Date	Champion	Country	Score	Tournament location	Purse ($)	Winner's share ($)
2008	May 30 – Jun 1	Mindy Kim	South Korea	213 (−3)	Geneva National Golf Club	100,000	14,000
2007	Jun 1–3	Sofie Andersson	Sweden	212 (−4)	Geneva National Golf Club	90,000	12,600
2006	Jun 2–4	Song-Hee Kim	South Korea	214 (−2)	Geneva National Golf Club	80,000	11,900
2003*	May 29 – Jun 1	Katherine Hull	Australia	210 (−6)	Ironwood Golf Course	70,000	9,800
2002	May 31 – Jun 2	Melinda Price	United States	218 (+2)	Ironwood Golf Course	65,000	9,100
2001	Jun 1–3	Beth Bauer	United States	212 (−4)	Ironwood Golf Course	60,000	8,400
2000	Jun 16–18	Jenn Brody	United States	210 (−6)	Ironwood Golf Course	50,000	7,000
1999**	Jun 11–13	Jane Egan	United States	137 (−7)	Ironwood Golf Course	45,000	6,600
1998		LaRee Sugg	United States	213 (−3)	Naga-Waukee Golf Course	40,000	5,300
1997		Nicole Jeray	United States	212 (−4)	Naga-Waukee Golf Course	40,000	5,300
1996		Vicki Moran	United States		Naga-Waukee Golf Course		
1995		Lisa Kartheiser	United States		Naga-Waukee Golf Course		

*Championship won in sudden-death playoff.
**Tournament shortened to 36 holes because of rain.
