= Slim Rhodes =

American singer-songwriter

Ethmer Cletus "Slim" Rhodes (April 27, 1912 – March 10, 1966) was an American country music and rockabilly guitarist and vocalist popular during the 1940s and 50s with his band, Slim Rhodes and His Mountaineers.

== Biography ==
Ethmer Cletus "Slim" Rhodes, the son of James K. Polk Rhodes and Amanda Elizabeth Patterson Montgomery, was born in Poughkeepsie, Arkansas. In 1928, he formed a band with brothers Gilbert Ray ("Speck"), Perry Hilburn ("Dusty") and sister Helen Beatrice ("Bea"). The group was later dubbed the Log Cabin Mountaineers by a Missouri state senator who invited them to play for the state legislature. Slim was M.C. and played guitar; Dusty played fiddle; Bea played fiddle, mandolin and accordion; Speck played the bass fiddle, banjo, and did comedy (and in 1960 joined Porter Wagoner's band). The Rhodes family toured from Missouri to California and back, playing in theaters. From 1938–41, the group was heard on KWOC-AM in Poplar Bluff, Missouri and often performed at the Mid-South Fair. Other members at the time were Buddy Simmons and Tiny Little.

Starting in 1939, "Slim Rhodes & The Mother's Best Mountaineers" were heard daily on WMC-AM in Memphis, Tennessee at 11:30 a.m. on the South Central Quality Network, sponsored by Mother's Best Flour. The group also had a weekly Saturday show over WMC-TV in Memphis from 12–12:30 p.m. By 1953, they also had a 30-minute live show on KATV-TV in Pine Bluff, Arkansas every Tuesday. Other members included Brad "Pee Wee" Suggs (electric guitar), who recorded on Meteor Records and later for Phillips International on his own; and Danny Holloway (steel guitar).

In 1950, Rhodes was signed by Gilt-Edge. Sun Records in Memphis signed the group from 1955–58, recording a mix of country and rockabilly. Rhodes acquired an Elvis Presley sound-alike vocalist, Sandy Brooks; releasing the rockabilly "Do What I Do" and "Take and Give". Between 1955–57, Rhodes was a frequent part of Sun tours through the southern U.S. In 1966, he released the album, The Rhodes Show on the Road on the Cotton Town Jubilee label.

Rhodes' radio and television and programs ended the mid-1960s. Slim died in 1966 from a fall in his Memphis home.

== Discography ==
Year	Title	Label #
1951	"Save A Little Love For Me"/"Skunk Hollow Boogie" (instrumental)	Gilt-Edge 5015
1951	"Sixty Days"/"Memphis Bounce" (instrumental)	Gilt-Edge 5026
1951	"Time Marches On"/"Hot Foot Rag" (instrumental)	Gilt-Edge 5034
1951	"Red, White and Blue"/"Ozark Boogie" (instrumental)	Gilt-Edge 5044
1955	"Uncertain Love"/"Don't Believe"'	Sun 216
1955	"Are You Ashamed Of Me"/"The House Of Sin"	Sun 225
1956	"Gonna Romp And Stomp"/"Bad Girl"	Sun 238
1957	"Do What I Do"/"Take And Give"	Sun 256
Unpublished titles
1956	"Do What I Do" (alt. version); "Take and Give" (alt. version)	Sun
