= Ernie Reid =

Australian rugby union player (c.1905–c.1938)

- Born: Ernie J. Reid c. 1905
- Died: c. 1938
- School: St Joseph's College

Rugby union career
- Position: centre
International career
Years	Team	Apps	(Points)
1925	Wallabies	3	(0)

Ernie J. Reid (c. 1905 – c. 1938) was a rugby union player who represented Australia.

Reid, a centre, claimed a total of 3 international rugby caps for Australia.

== Published sources ==
- Howell, Max (2006) Born to Lead - Wallaby Test Captains (2005) Celebrity Books, New Zealand
