= Erni Hiir =

Estonian poet and translator

Erni Hiir (real name Ernst Hiir; 29 March 1900, in Karjatnurme, Kreis Fellin – 27 October 1989) was an Estonian poet and translator.

From 1921 to 1922 he studied at the University of Tartu.

From 1927, he was a member of Estonian Writers' Union. When Estonia was occupied in 1940, he was loyal to the Soviet authorities. From 1945 to 1960, he was the executive secretary of the Tartu branch of the Writers' Union. In 1962, he moved to Tallinn.

He is buried in Metsakalmistu Cemetery.

== Works ==
- 1924: poetry collection "Arlekinaad" ('Harlequinade')
- 1924: poetry collection "Huhu. Merituulen" ('Huhu. In the Sea Wind')
- 1926: poetry collection "Meeri-Maria-Mari"
