= Ernie Fixmer =

American drifting driver

- Fixmer in 2003
- Nationality: American
- Born: February 19, 1977 (age 49) Los Angeles, California, U.S.

D1 Grand Prix
- Years active: 2003-2007
- Teams: Fixmer Racing
- Best finish: 7th in 2003

Awards
- 2005: Hardest Working Drifter, Formula D

Ernie Fixmer (born February 19, 1977, in Los Angeles, California) is a drifting driver from the United States. Fixmer is one of the most recognizable figures in the early history of drifting in the United States, and became one of the first drivers with a manufacturer backing (with Rotora) in the summer of 2003. Fixmer was the first American driver to compete in a sudden death match against Japan's points leader in the first D1 Grand Prix's professional series in the U.S., presented by Slipstream Global, currently known as Formula D.

== Career ==
Fixmer has over 13 years of experience in the drifting scene, after learning the sport in Okinawa, Japan while enlisted in the United States Marine Corps. Fixmer competed in D1 Grand Prix from 2004 through 2006, and also in the Formula Drift series in 2004 as the number 13 driver and 2005. Fixmer continued his career in drifting while driving in exhibition demos, both domestically and internationally. Fixmer judged for NOPI Drift Series in 2007 and continues to judge for the ongoing 2008 drift series in Formula DRIFT.

== History ==
Fixmer was first introduced to drifting in December 1999 in Okinawa, Japan, while enlisted in the United States Marine Corps as a helicopter mechanic. During this era of early pre-American drifting, such names as Keiichi Tsuchiya ("Drift King"), Ross Petty, Kazuya Bai (Signal Auto) & Yasuyuki Kazama, were involved in the motorsport in Okinawa.

Before his official orders back to the United States came through, Fixmer purchased a Nissan 240SX while vacationing in Washington. When his overseas tour with the USMC ended, Fixmer returned to the US to build his personal state-side drift car. Through purchasing parts from a local shop (JSpec.com) to build his vehicle, Fixmer became friends with the owner, Sam Chang.

Fixmer borrowed Sam Chang's personal Nissan 240SX coupe to be driven in the D1 Grand Prix driver's search at Irwindale Speedway in Irwindale, California, on June 15, 2003, which served as the first official appearance of D1 in the US. Fixmer was one of the first American drivers who qualified for the US Series competition.

After acquiring a D1 competition license at the event, Sam Chang introduced Fixmer to Loren Ho, President of Rotora. At this time, Rotora chose Fixmer's personal drift car to become the first sponsorship by a motorsports manufacturer in early competition series' of the sport in the United States.

After completing the build of Fixmer's 240SX, it was then used to compete in the Inaugural D1 Grand Prix USA event, which was run by Slipstream Global, currently known as Formula D.. At this event, Fixmer became the first American driver to go into a sudden death round with the Japanese series points leader, Youichi Imamura, after all American drivers were knocked out in their first runs. This moment served as the turning point in the motorsport in the US, and quickly attracted the attention of the Japanese drivers.

Fixmer continued to compete in the D1 Grand Prix point series in 2004, 2005 & 2006. In 2004 and 2005, Fixmer competed in the Formula D point series, and also was invited to drift in the first exhibition demos provided by Formula D & Champ Car in Cleveland, Ohio, San Jose, California, Long Beach, California & Denver, Colorado. In 2006, Fixmer drove in the first exhibition demo for the Indy Racing League in St. Petersburg, Florida, and internationally in an exhibition demo in Beijing, China with World Drift Series. In 2007, Fixmer headed the judging panel for the introductory year of Nopi Drift Series.

In July 2008, Fixmer was announced as a judge for the Formula DRIFT series, effective immediately to carry his judging responsibilities for at least the rest of the season. Fixmer replaced Alex Pfeiffer, who stepped down as a judge to pursue his career as a driver.
