= Ern Rowarth =

Australian rules footballer

Personal information
- Full name: Ernest John Rowarth
- Born: 28 June 1926
- Died: 15 December 2004 (aged 78)
- Original team: Oakleigh Juniors
- Height: 185 cm (6 ft 1 in)
- Weight: 92 kg (203 lb)

Playing career^{1}
Years	Club	Games (Goals)
1945–47	Melbourne	20 (3)
- ^{1} Playing statistics correct to the end of 1947.

Ernest John Rowarth (28 June 1926 – 15 December 2004) was an Australian rules footballer who played with Melbourne in the Victorian Football League (VFL).
