= Ern Hocking =

Australian rules footballer

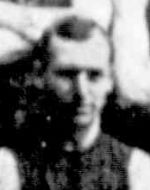

Personal information
- Full name: Ernest Herbert Victor Hocking
- Born: 16 May 1882; Bendigo, Victoria
- Died: 19 June 1971 (aged 89); Preston, Victoria
- Original team: Leopold
- Position: Rover

Playing career^{1}
Years	Club	Games (Goals)
1902–03	Melbourne	25 (8)
- ^{1} Playing statistics correct to the end of 1903.

Ernest Herbert Victor Hocking (16 May 1882 – 19 June 1971) was an Australian rules footballer who played with Melbourne in the Victorian Football League (VFL).
