= Ernie Whitchurch =

English footballer

Personal information
- Full name: Ernest Whitchurch
- Date of birth: 7 August 1891
- Place of birth: Sheffield, England
- Date of death: 2 December 1957 (aged 66)
- Height: 5 ft 10 in (1.78 m)
- Position: Wing half

Senior career*
Years	Team	Apps	(Gls)
1911–1912	Sharrow Reform		
1912–1921	Grimsby Town	30	(0)
1921	Rotherham Town		
1921–192?	Wombwell		
- * Club domestic league appearances and goals

Ernest Whitchurch (7 August 1891 – 2 December 1957) was an English professional footballer who played as a wing half.
