= Brad Suggs =

US guitarist, singer, and songwriter

Brad Suggs is a singer and songwriter but is best known as a guitarist who contributed greatly to the legacy of Phillips' Sun and Phillips' International labels. His name is widely unknown although he appeared on more than eight Sun and Phillips International records.

== Biography ==
=== Early years ===
Brad Suggs, born Luther Bradley "Pee Wee" Suggs (also known as "LB" and "Junior,") was born in 1933 in North Carolina. Suggs was one of twelve children born to his parents on their farm near Raleigh, North Carolina.

=== Career ===
Suggs first began playing guitar professionally with the Loden Family in North Carolina. Sonny James (born Sonny Loden) and Suggs moved to Memphis, Tennessee around 1950. When Suggs wasn't working in the studio he worked full-time at Sears. James wanted Suggs to go on the road touring with him, but Suggs decided not to due to family obligations.

Instead, Suggs began playing with the Slim Rhodes Band. He played with the Rhodes group on all their Sun recordings, as well as on eight tracks recorded in 1950 during the earliest days of the Memphis Recording Service (1). When Suggs began releasing singles Rockabilly was not a household word yet and the Sun label was still being shaped (trying to find its niche).

In 1959, Suggs began to work in the semi-official capacity of Sun producer and bandleader (1). It was at this time that his five singles were issued on the Phillips International label. His other accomplishments include backing Elvis Presley during the King’s homecoming concert on February 25, 1961. (Suggs can be seen playing guitar in the background of the famous picture of comedian George Jessell bowing at Elvis' feet during the concert.) He also worked with the Memphis Symphony Orchestra. Suggs’ recordings can be found on The Complete Sun Singles, Volumes 1, 2 and 6, issued by Bear Family Records.

Suggs appeared on more than eight Sun records (more than Elvis Presley, Billy Riley, Warren Smith, Jerry Lee Lewis, Johnny Cash, and Charlie Rich) (1). Suggs also sang and got label credit on "Don’t Believe" (Sun 216), "Are You Ashamed of Me?" (Sun 225), and "Bad Girl" (Sun 238), which were recorded with the Slim Rhodes' band.

== Discography ==
=== Singles ===
Suggs' singles include: "706 Union," "Low Outside," "I Walk The Line" (an instrumental release that was a retread of the famous Cash hit), "Ooh Wee," "Cloudy," "Sam’s Tune," "My Gypsy," and "Elephant Walk."

=== Other ===
It can be confirmed that at least Suggs’ guitar playing appears on the following recordings (1):

- Jerry Lee Lewis—"I Could Never Be Ashamed Of You" (Sun 330)
- Hillbilly Music (Sun LP 1265)
- "When I Get Paid" (Sun 352)
- Hello Josephine (LP 1265)
- "I’ve Been Twisting" (Sun 374)
- "I Know What It Means" (Sun 396)
- Jack Clement—"The Black Haired Man" (Sun 311)
- Jerry McGill—"Lovestruck" (Sun 326)
- Johnny Powers—"Be Mine, All Mine" (Sun 327)
- Slim Rhodes—"Do What I Do" (Sun 256)
- Billy Riley—"One More Time" (Sun 322)
- Charlie Rich—"School Days" (PI 3560)
- "Midnight Blues" (PI 3576)
- Warren Smith—"Black Jack David" (Sun 250)
- "Ubangi Stomp" (Sun 250)
- Jeb Stewart—"I Bet You’re Gonna Like It" (PI 3575)
- Vernon Taylor—"Mystery Train" (Sun 325)
- Hayden Thompson—"Rockabilly Girl" (originally unissued)
- Thomas Wayne—"I’ve Got It Made" (PI 3577)
- Ray Smith—several sessions/unknown titles
