= HMS Erne =

The Royal Navy has four vessels with the name HMS Erne; the name comes from the white-tailed eagle, also known as the erne.

- The 20-gun sixth-rate post ship HMS Erne (1813), launched in 1813 and wrecked in 1819 on the Isle of Sal, Cape Verde.
- The Albacore-class gunboat HMS Erne (1856) launched in 1856 and broken up in 1874.
- The torpedo boat destroyer HMS Erne (1903) launched in 1903 and wrecked in 1915 at Rattray Head.
- The sloop HMS Erne (U03) launched in 1939, renamed Wessex in 1952, and broken up in 1965.
