= Ernie Newton =

Ernie Newton may refer to:

- Ernie Newton (actor) (1925–1996), American actor and voice actor
- Ernie Newton (politician) (born 1956), American politician in Connecticut
- Ernie Newton (bass player) (1908–1976), American musician
