= Welch Suggs =

American sportswriter

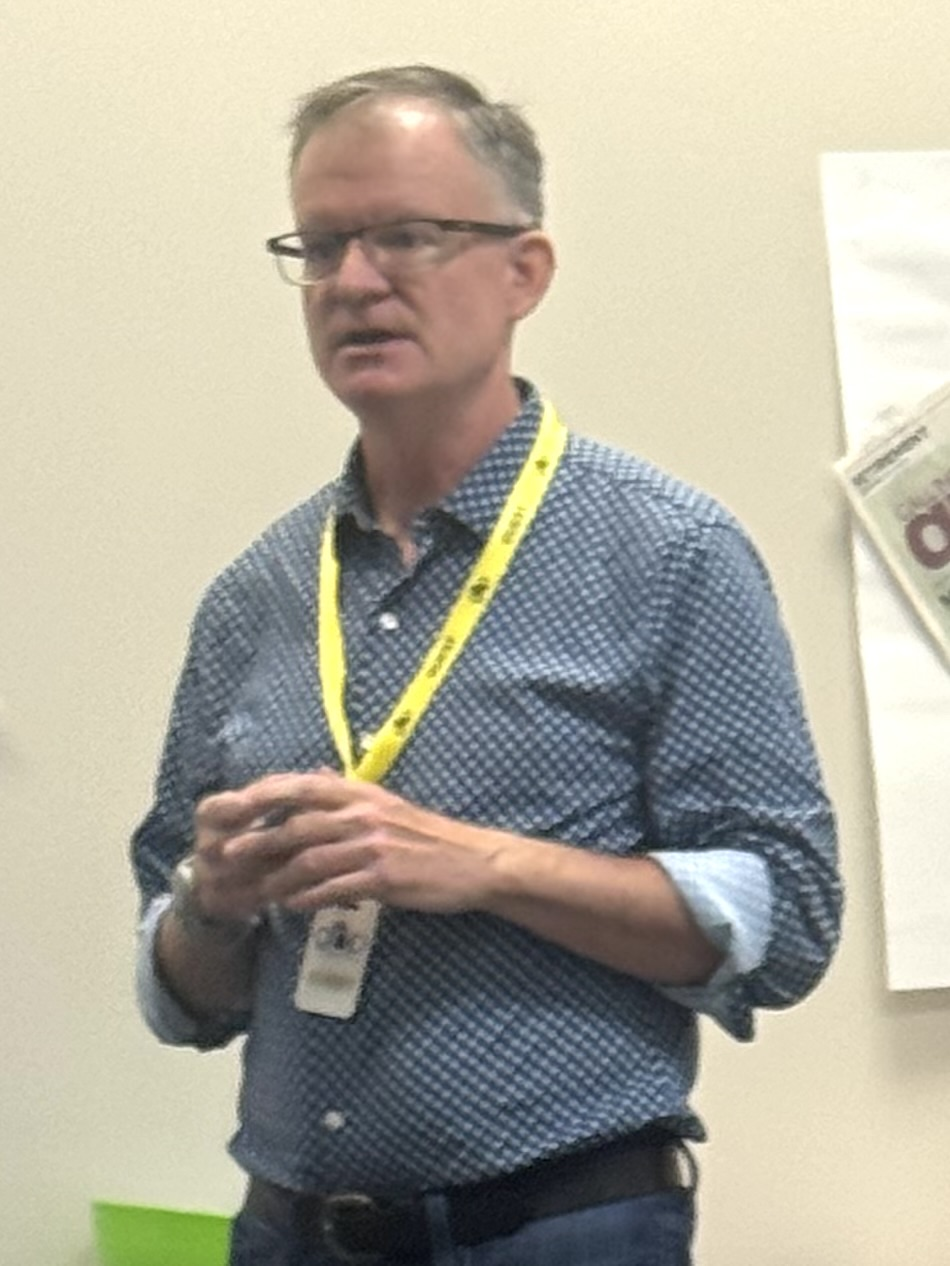
Suggs in June 2026

Welch Suggs is an associate professor of sports media at the University of Georgia. He is a former sportswriter, chiefly covering American collegiate sports. He has served an associate director for the Knight Commission on Intercollegiate Athletics and an associate professor of journalism at the University of Georgia. He is a writer for The Chronicle of Higher Education. In 2005, Suggs released A Place on the Team: The Triumph and Tragedy of Title IX through Princeton University Press about Title IX, concerning sex discrimination in education.
