= Employer Reference Number =

Identifier in the UK tax system

An Employer Reference Number Number (ERN Number) or Employer PAYE Reference is a unique reference number issued in the United Kingdom by HMRC to an employer. Every organisation operating a Pay As You Earn (PAYE) scheme is allocated an ERN, a unique set of letters and numbers used by HMRC (and others) to identify each employer, consisting of a three-digit HMRC office number and a reference number unique to each business.

The ERN is alphanumeric (consisting of both letters and numbers) in the format of 123/XX12345, or 123/X12345 (prior to 2001), where the first three characters represent the Tax Office catchment area and the last six or seven characters represent a unique organisation or employer. The ERN can be found on mandatory HMRC documentation, including P45, P60, P11/D and payslips.

The Financial Conduct Authority (FCA), which regulates insurance companies in the UK, requires insurers and brokers to obtain the ERN from clients whom they are insuring or for whom they are arranging insurance for Employers' Liability, and to state the ERN in their Employers' Liability Register. ERN's are also used by the Employers' Liability Tracing Office, an independent industry body recognised by the FCA, who can assist employees to find their former employer's Employers' Liability Insurance provider if they need to make a claim for injury or illness incurred at work.
