= LaRee Sugg =

American female golfer (born 1969)

Personal information
- Born: November 11, 1969 (age 56) Petersburg, Virginia, U.S.

Career
- Sport: Golf
- College: UCLA
- Turned professional: 1992
- Former tours: LPGA Tour; Symetra Tour

Number of wins by tour
- Epson Tour: 1

LaRee Pearl Sugg (born November 11, 1969) is an American athletic director for the University of Richmond since 2005. Before joining Richmond, Sugg became the third African American woman to play on the LPGA Tour in history. Sugg played on the LPGA Tour from 1995 to 1996 and 2000 to 2001. She made appearances at the U.S. Women's Open and Women's British Open. Apart from the LPGA Tour, Sugg played on the Futures Tour, Ladies European Tour and Ladies Asian Golf Tour during the 1990s. During her career, Sugg won the 1998 Aurora Health Care Futures Classic. She also was third at the 1993 Singapore Ladies Open and 1997 Indonesia Ladies Open.

== Early life and education ==
Sugg was born on November 11, 1969, in Petersburg, Virginia. She began golfing at the age of six and won over thirty titles as a junior golfer. With a golf scholarship, Sugg went to the University of California, Los Angeles for her post-secondary education. During her four years at UCLA, she was on the college's golf team. At the 1991 NCAA Division I Women's Golf Championship, Sugg started the 13th hole in front of the tee markers and was given a two-stroke penalty. At the playoff hole during the NCAA championship, Sugg scored a birdie and won the championship for UCLA. She graduated from UCLA with an English degree.

== Career ==
For her golfing career, Sugg started with the Futures Tour in 1991. The following year, Sugg also joined the Ladies European Tour. That year, Sugg attempted to get an LPGA Tour card but failed to qualify. While Sugg continued to play on both the European and Futures Tours until 1994, Sugg briefly played on the Ladies Asian Golf Tour in 1993.

In 1995, Sugg became the third African-American woman to play on the LPGA Tour and the first since Renee Powell, who ended her career in 1978. After playing for two years, Sugg lost her LPGA Tour card in 1996 due to her season's winnings. After leaving the LPGA Tour, Sugg continued to play on the Ladies Asian Golf Tour and Futures Tour during the late 1990s. During the 1990s, she won the 1998 Aurora Health Care Futures Classic. She also placed third at the 1993 Singapore Ladies Open and 1997 Indonesia Ladies Open.

Sugg was the only African-American woman golfer on the LPGA Tour when she returned at the 2000 Cup Noodles Hawaiian Ladies Open. That year, she finished in 8th place at the 2000 Wegmans Rochester International. Sugg played at the U.S. Women's Open multiple times during her career. When the Women's British Open became a major during 2001, she did not make the cut. Sugg ended her LPGA Tour career that year when she lost her tour card for a second time.

After leaving the LPGA Tour, Sugg moved on to the University of Richmond and became the inaugural head coach of their women's golf team in 2002. At Richmond, Sugg briefly coached the men's golf team in 2005 before working as an assistant athletic director for the university from 2005 to 2008. From 2008 onwards, she continued her athletic director career with Richmond as an associate director and deputy director.
