= Ern Penrose =

Australian rules footballer

Personal information
- Full name: Ernest Penrose
- Born: 2 November 1884; Collingwood, Victoria
- Died: 19 May 1968 (aged 83); South Melbourne, Victoria

Playing career^{1}
| Years | Club | Games (Goals) |
| 1905 | Melbourne | 1 (0) |
- ^{1} Playing statistics correct to the end of 1905.

Ernest Penrose (2 November 1884 – 19 May 1968) was an Australian rules footballer who played with Melbourne in the Victorian Football League (VFL).
