= Surg, Birjand =

Surg سورگ
- Village
- Location within Iran
- Coordinates: 32°45′52″N 59°22′37″E
- Country: Iran
- Province: South Khorasan
- County: Birjand
- Bakhsh: Central
- Rural District: Baqeran

Population (2006)
  - Total: 134
- Time zone: UTC+3:30 (IRST)
  - Summer (DST): UTC+4:30 (IRDT)

Surg (Persian: سورگ, also Romanized as Sūrg, Sūrag, and Soorag; also known as Sūg) is a village in Baqeran Rural District, in the Central District of Birjand County, South Khorasan Province, Iran. At the 2006 census, its population was 134, in 48 families.
