= Erne =

An erne is a sea eagle, or an eagle more broadly.

Erne may refer to:

== People ==
- Adam Erne (born 1995), American ice hockey player
- Philippe Erne (born 1986), Liechtenstein footballer
- Young Erne (1884–1944), American boxer

== Ships ==
- HMS Erne, various ships of Britain's Royal Navy
- Erne (ship), a 1886 British (later Canadian) ship that transported Indian labourers

== Other ==
- Erne, a type of shot in the game of Pickleball
- Erne Integrated College, Enniskillen, Northern Ireland
- Earl Erne, a title in the peerage of Ireland
- Lough Erne, two connected lakes in Ireland
- River Erne, a river in Ireland
- Ertzainen Nazional Elkartasuna (National Solidarity of Ertzainas, known as ErNE) a workers union of the Ertzaintza (police of the Basque Country)

== See also ==
- Ern (disambiguation)
- Ernes, a commune in France
- Shannon–Erne Waterway, a canal in Ireland
