= Heidi und Erni =

- Starring: Heidi Kabel; Erni Singerl
- Country of origin: Germany

Heidi und Erni is a German television series.

== See also ==
- List of German television series
