= Erni Gregorčič =

Slovenian powerlifter

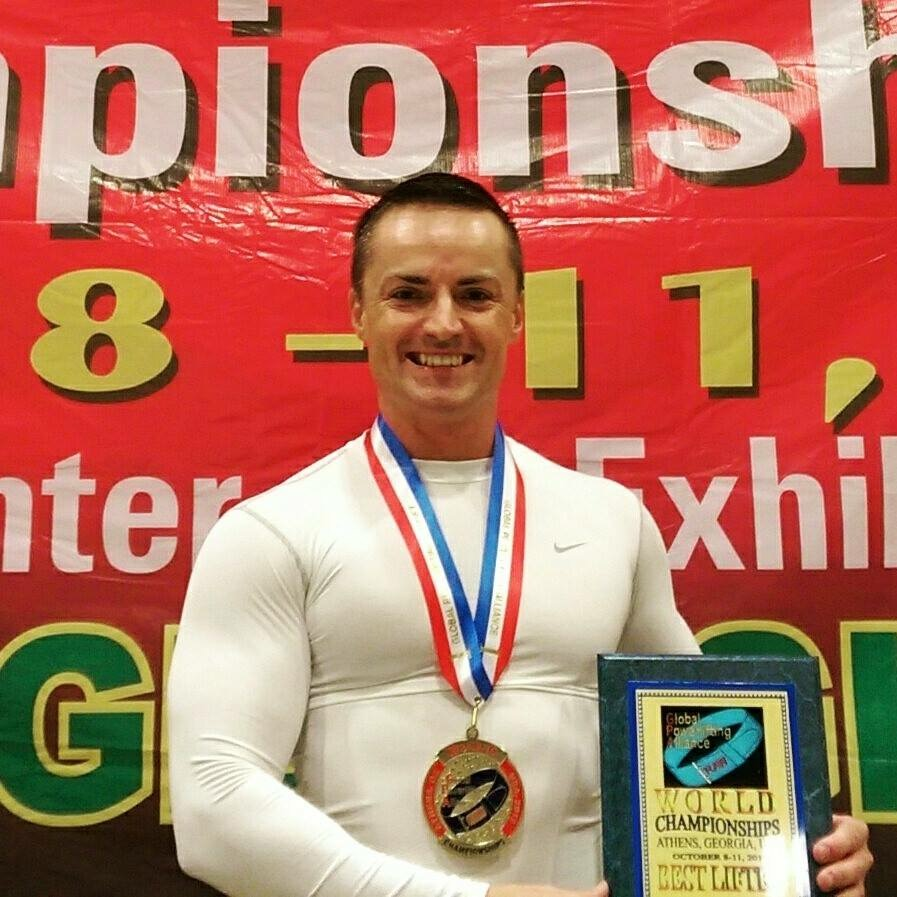
- Erni Gregorčič at Worlds 2015 in Athens, Georgia, USA

Personal information
- Full name: Erni Gregorčič
- Born: 4 June 1976 (age 50) Ljubljana, Slovenia
- Occupations: personal trainer, strength coach, powerlifter
- Years active: 2010–present
- Height: 1.72 m (5 ft 8 in)
- Weight: 75 kg (165 lb)
- Website: http://osebnitrener.webs.com/

Sport
- Country: Slovenia
- Sport: Powerlifting
- Weight class: −75 kg, −82.5 kg
- Events: Powerlifting, bench press, push & pull, deadlift
Medal record
Men's Powerliftting
Representing Slovenia
International powerlifting competitions
Event	1st	2nd	3rd
World Championships	30	1	1
European Championships	22	2	1
Total	52	3	2
- Updated on 19 November 2019

Erni Gregorčič (born 4 June 1976) is the most decorated and successful Slovenian powerlifter and record holder. He is a professional personal trainer and specialized strength coach. He is also the coach of Mariša Golob, the most successful female in Slovenian powerlifting history.

Medal record

Men's Powerlifting – raw

Representing Slovenia

World Championship
Gold medal – first place	2010 GPC Prague	Powerlifting
Gold medal – first place	2013 GPA Tampere	Powerlifting
Gold medal – first place	2014 WUAP Telfs	Powerlifting
Gold medal – first place	2014 GPA Sydney	Powerlifting
Gold medal – first place	2015 GPA Athens	Powerlifting
Gold medal – first place	2016 WUAP Herzberg	Powerlifting
Gold medal – first place	2016 GPA Moscow	Powerlifting
Gold medal – first place	2017 WUAP Prague	Powerlifting
Gold medal – first place	2018 WPA Lutsk	Powerlifting
Gold medal – first place	2018 WUAP Trnava	Powerlifting
Gold medal – first place	2018 IPL Saint Petersburg	Powerlifting
Gold medal – first place	2019 IPL Leipzig	Powerlifting

European Championship
Silver medal – second place	2011 GPC Eger	Powerlifting
Gold medal – first place	2014 GPA Kyiv	Powerlifting
Gold medal – first place	2014 GPA Tbilisi	Powerlifting
Gold medal – first place	2015 WUAP Prague	Powerlifting
Gold medal – first place	2016 GPA Zadar	Powerlifting
Gold medal – first place	2016 WUAP Gyula	Powerlifting
Gold medal – first place	2017 WUAP Telfs	Powerlifting
Gold medal – first place	2018 WPC Le Pont-de-Claix	Powerlifting
Gold medal – first place	2019 WUAP Frauenau	Powerlifting
Gold medal – first place	2025 WPA Lakitelek	Powerlifting

Medal record

Men's Benchpress – raw

Representing Slovenia

World Championship
Silver medal – second place	2010 GPC Prague	Bench press
Gold medal – first place	2013 GPA Tampere	Bench press
Gold medal – first place	2014 WUAP Telfs	Bench press
Gold medal – first place	2014 GPA Sydney	Bench press
Gold medal – first place	2015 GPA Athens	Bench press
Gold medal – first place	2017 WUAP Prague	Bench press

European Championship
Bronze medal – third place	2011 GPC Eger	Bench press
Silver medal – second place	2011 WPC Prague	Bench press
Gold medal – first place	2012 GPC Bled	Bench press
Gold medal – first place	2014 GPA Kyiv	Bench press
Gold medal – first place	2015 GPA Tbilisi	Bench press

Medal record

Men's Powerlifting – equipped

Representing Slovenia

World Championship
Bronze medal – third place	2012 GPC Bardejov	Powerlifting
Gold medal – first place	2013 WUAP Eilenburg	Powerlifting

European Championship
Gold medal – first place	2012 GPC Bled	Powerlifting
Gold medal – first place	2013 WUAP Trnava	Powerlifting
Gold medal – first place	2014 WUAP Prešov	Powerlifting

Medal record

Men's Benchpress – equipped

Representing Slovenia

World Championship
Gold medal – first place	2013 WUAP Eilenburg	Bench press

European Championship
Gold medal – first place	2012 GPC Bled	Bench press
Gold medal – first place	2013 WUAP Trnava	Bench press
Gold medal – first place	2014 IPO Kyiv	Bench press
Gold medal – first place	2014 WUAP Prešov	Bench press
Gold medal – first place	2015 WUAP Prague	Bench press
Gold medal – first place	2016 IPO Zadar	Bench press

Medal record

Men's Push&Pull

Representing Slovenia

World Championship
Gold medal – first place	2014 GPA Sydney	Push&Pull
Gold medal – first place	2015 GPA Athens	Push&Pull
Gold medal – first place	2016 GPA Moscow	Push&Pull
Gold medal – first place	2018 IPL Saint Petersburg	Push&Pull

European Championship
Gold medal – first place	2015 GPA Tbilisi	Push&Pull

Medal record

Men's Deadlift

Representing Slovenia

World Championship
Gold medal – first place	2014 GPA Sydney	Deadlift
Gold medal – first place	2015 GPA Athens	Deadlift
Gold medal – first place	2018 WPA Lutsk	Deadlift
Gold medal – first place	2018 WUAP Trnava	Deadlift
Gold medal – first place	2018 IPL Saint Petersburg	Deadlift
Gold medal – first place	2019 IPL Leipzig	Deadlift

European Championship
Gold medal – first place	2015 GPA Tbilisi	Deadlift

Medal record

Men's Squat

Representing Slovenia

World Championship
Gold medal – first place	2016 GPA Moscow	Squat

== Career ==
In 1998 Erni Gregorčič started working in a local gym as a personal trainer and trained on daily basis. During his active years as a personal trainer he discovered powerlifting and was compelled to try it. He started competing in 2010 and since then won more than 30 World and European Championship titles in powerlifting, bench press, push&pull and deadlift.

Throughout his powerlifting career he competed in many different powerlifting federations (GPC, WPC, GPA, WUAP, IPO, WPA) and still holds World and European records in a few of them. He is currently actively participating and competing in WUAP and GPA and is also Slovenian president of this two federations.

== Personal records ==
Official powerlifting competition records (raw - sleeves):

Squat	210 kg
Bench press	151 kg
Deadlift	260 kg
Total	620 kg

Official powerlifting competition records (raw - wraps):

Squat	220 kg
Bench press	151 kg
Deadlift	256 kg
Total	623 kg

Official powerlifting competition records (equipped):

Squat	230 kg
Bench press	170 kg
Deadlift	225 kg
Total	625 kg

Official bench press competition record (raw):

Bench press	151 kg

Official bench press competition record (equipped):

Bench press	182,5 kg

Official push&pull competition records (raw) :

Bench press	150 kg
Deadlift	251 kg
Total	396 kg

Official deadlift competition record (raw) :

Deadlift	260 kg

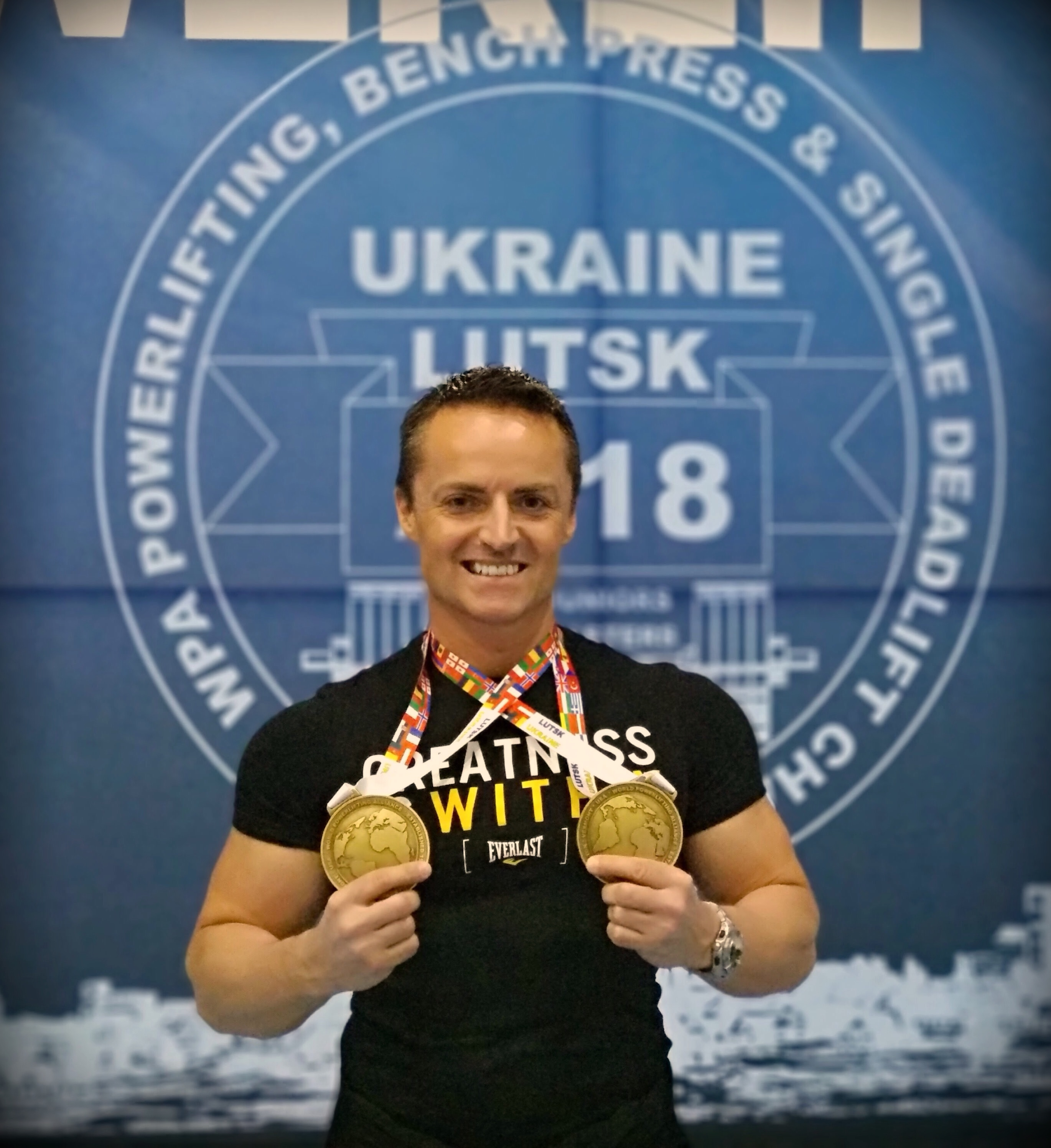
Erni Gregorčič after the award ceremony at 2018 WPA World Championship in Lutsk, Ukraine.

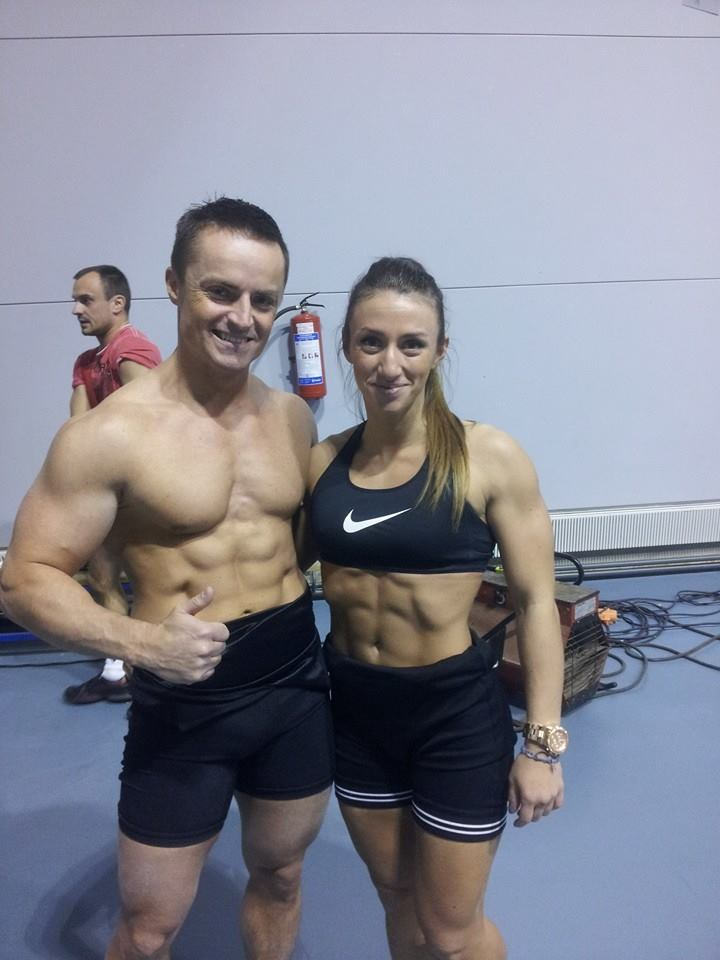
Erni Gregorčič and Mariša Golob after competition at the 2013 Worlds Championship in Tampere, Finland

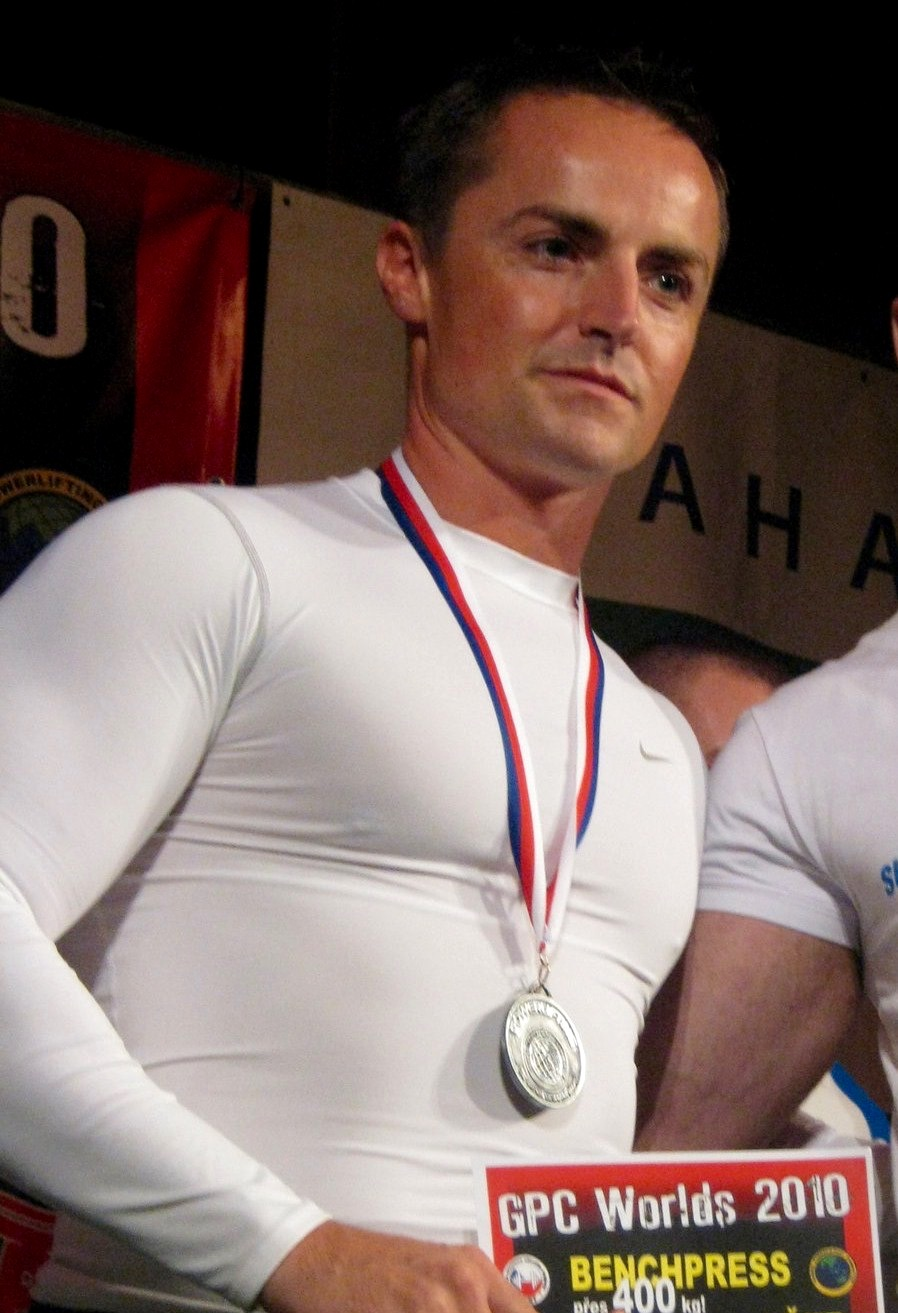
Erni Gregorčič at the 2010 World Championship in Prague, Czech Republic

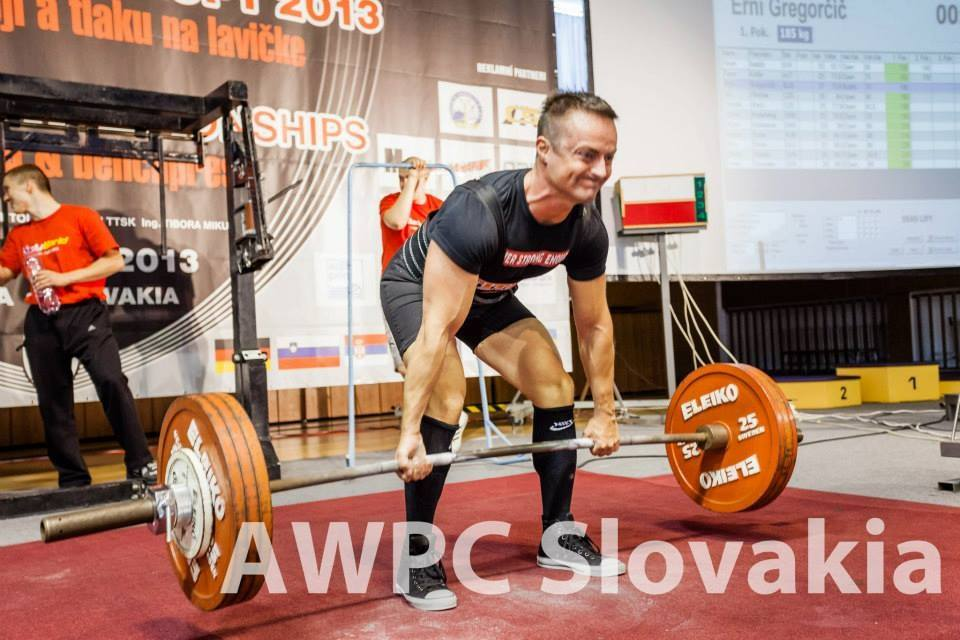
Erni Gregorčič at the 2013 European Championship in Trnava, Slovakia

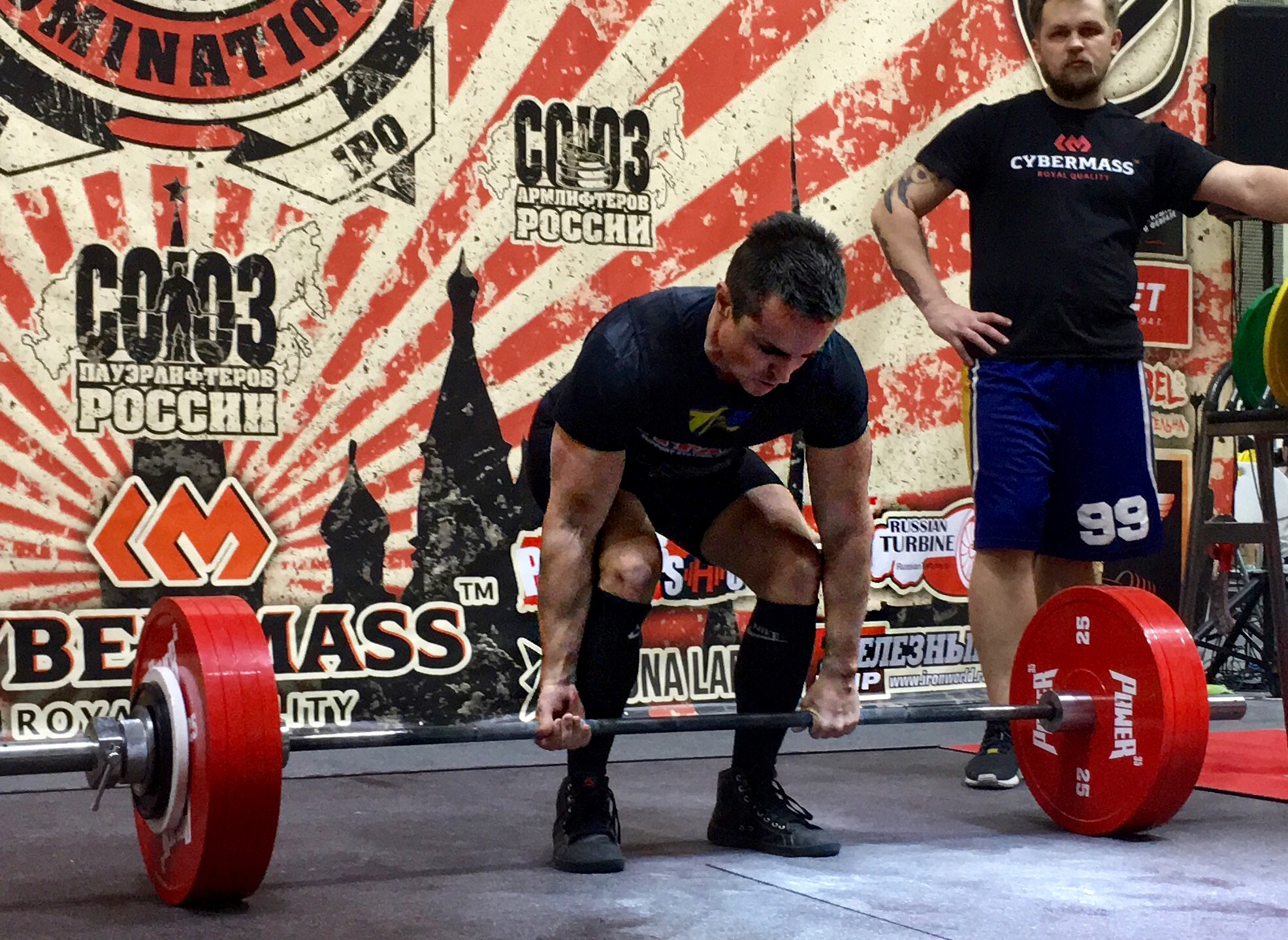
Deadlift at the 2016 World Championships in Moscow, Russia

== National, European and World records ==
=== National records ===
Erni is the current Slovenian powerlifting, bench press, push&pull and deadlift record holder in −75 kg weight class in open, submaster and master category.

=== European records ===
Erni holds the current GPA European submaster bench press and push&pull record in −75 kg weight class. He also holds IPO European submaster equipped bench press record in −75 kg weight class.

=== World records ===
Federation	Event	Type	Weight class	Category
WUAP	Powerlifting (squat)	raw	−75 kg	submaster
WUAP	Powerlifting (bench press)	raw	−75 kg	submaster
WUAP	Powerlifting (total)	raw	−75 kg	submaster
WUAP	Powerlifting (squat)	raw	−75 kg	master 40–44
WUAP	Powerlifting (bench press)	raw	−75 kg	master 40–44
WUAP	Powerlifting (deadlift)	raw	−75 kg	master 40–44
WUAP	Powerlifting (total)	raw	−75 kg	master 40–44
WUAP	Bench press	raw	−75 kg	submaster
WUAP	Deadlift	raw	−75 kg	master 40–44
WUAP	Deadlift	raw	−82,5 kg	master 40–44
WPA	Powerlifting (squat)	raw	−75 kg	master 40–44
WPA	Powerlifting (deadlift)	raw	−75 kg	master 40–44
WPA	Powerlifting (total)	raw	−75 kg	master 40–44
WPA	Deadlift	raw	−75 kg	master 40–44
WPC	Powerlifting (squat)	raw	−75 kg	master 40–44
WPC	Powerlifting (deadlift)	raw	−75 kg	master 40–44
WPC	Powerlifting (total)	raw	−75 kg	master 40–44
GPA	Powerlifting (deadlift)	raw	−75 kg	master 40–49
GPA	Push&Pull (bench press)	raw	−75 kg	master 40–49
GPA	Push&Pull (deadlift)	raw	−75 kg	master 40–49
GPA	Push&Pull (total)	raw	−75 kg	master 40–49
IPL	Powerlifting (deadlift)	raw (sleeves)	−75 kg	master 40–44
IPL	Deadlift	raw	−75 kg	master 40–44

== World and European Championships ==
Place	Championships	Date	Location	Event	Type	Weight class	Category
1	GPC World Championships	6–11 Sep 2010	Prague, Czech Republic	Powerlifting	raw	−75 kg	open
2	GPC World Championships	6–11 Sep 2010	Prague, Czech Republic	Bench press	raw	−75 kg	open
2	GPC European Championships	12–19 Jun 2011	Eger, Hungary	Powerlifting	raw	−75 kg	open
3	GPC European Championships	12–19 Jun 2011	Eger, Hungary	Bench press	raw	−75 kg	open
2	WPC European Championships	27 Jun – 2 July 2011	Prague, Czech Republic	Bench press	raw	−75 kg	open
1	GPC European Championships	14–19 May 2012	Bled, Slovenia	Powerlifting	equipped	−75 kg	open
1	GPC European Championships	14–19 May 2012	Bled, Slovenia	Bench press	equipped	−75 kg	open
1	GPC European Championships	14–19 May 2012	Bled, Slovenia	Bench press	raw	−75 kg	open
3	GPC World Championships	17–22 Sep 2012	Bardejov, Slovakia	Powerlifting	equipped	−75 kg	open
4	GPC World Championships	17–22 Sep 2012	Bardejov, Slovakia	Bench press	equipped	−75 kg	open
4	GPC World Championships	17–22 Sep 2012	Bardejov, Slovakia	Bench press	raw	−75 kg	open
1	WUAP European Championships	12–15 Jun 2013	Trnava, Slovakia	Powerlifting	equipped	−75 kg	submaster
1	WUAP European Championships	12–15 Jun 2013	Trnava, Slovakia	Bench press	equipped	−75 kg	submaster
1	WUAP World Championships	25–28 Sep 2013	Eilenburg, Germany	Powerlifting	equipped	−82,5 kg	submaster
1	WUAP World Championships	25–28 Sep 2013	Eilenburg, Germany	Bench press	equipped	−82,5 kg	submaster
1	GPA World Championships	5–8 Dec 2013	Tampere, Finland	Powerlifting	raw	−75 kg	submaster
1	GPA World Championships	5–8 Dec 2013	Tampere, Finland	Bench press	raw	−75 kg	submaster
1	GPA European Championships	4–5 May 2014	Kyiv, Ukraine	Powerlifting	raw	−75 kg	submaster
1	GPA European Championships	4–5 May 2014	Kyiv, Ukraine	Bench press	raw	−75 kg	submaster
1	IPO European Championships	4–5 May 2014	Kyiv, Ukraine	Bench press	equipped	−75 kg	submaster
1	WUAP European Championships	13–14 Jun 2014	Prešov, Slovakia	Powerlifting	equipped	−75 kg	submaster
1	WUAP European Championships	13–14 Jun 2014	Prešov, Slovakia	Bench press	equipped	−75 kg	submaster
1	WUAP World Championships	7–11 Oct 2014	Telfs, Austria	Powerlifting	raw	−75 kg	submaster
1	WUAP World Championships	7–11 Oct 2014	Telfs, Austria	Bench press	raw	−75 kg	submaster
1	GPA World Championships	21–24 Nov 2014	Sydney, Australia	Powerlifting	raw	−75 kg	submaster
1	GPA World Championships	21–24 Nov 2014	Sydney, Australia	Bench press	raw	−75 kg	submaster
1	GPA World Championships	21–24 Nov 2014	Sydney, Australia	Deadlift	raw	−75 kg	submaster
1	GPA World Championships	21–24 Nov 2014	Sydney, Australia	Push&Pull	raw	−75 kg	submaster
1	GPA European Championships	24–26 Apr 2015	(Georgia (country)) Tbilisi, Georgia	Powerlifting	raw	−75 kg	submaster
1	GPA European Championships	24–26 Apr 2015	(Georgia (country)) Tbilisi, Georgia	Bench press	raw	−75 kg	submaster
1	GPA European Championships	24–26 Apr 2015	(Georgia (country)) Tbilisi, Georgia	Deadlift	raw	−75 kg	submaster
1	GPA European Championships	24–26 Apr 2015	(Georgia (country)) Tbilisi, Georgia	Push&Pull	raw	−75 kg	submaster
1	WUAP European Championships	16–20 Jun 2015	Prague, Czech Republic	Powerlifting	raw	−75 kg	submaster
1	WUAP European Championships	16–20 Jun 2015	Prague, Czech Republic	Bench press	equipped	−75 kg	submaster
1	GPA World Championships	8–11 Oct 2015	Athens, Georgia, United States	Powerlifting	raw	−75 kg	submaster
1	GPA World Championships	8–11 Oct 2015	Athens, Georgia, United States	Bench press	raw	−75 kg	submaster
1	GPA World Championships	8–11 Oct 2015	Athens, Georgia, United States	Deadlift	raw	−75 kg	submaster
1	GPA World Championships	8–11 Oct 2015	Athens, Georgia, United States	Push&Pull	raw	−75 kg	submaster
1	GPA European Championships	27–29 May 2016	Zadar, Croatia	Powerlifting	raw	−75 kg	submaster
1	IPO European Championships	27–29 May 2016	Zadar, Croatia	Bench press	equipped	−82,5 kg	submaster
1	WUAP European Championships	15–18 June 2016	Gyula, Hungary	Powerlifting	raw	−75 kg	master
1	WUAP World Championships	4–11 Oct 2016	Herzberg, Germany	Powerlifting	raw	−75 kg	master
1	GPA World Championships	8–11 Dec 2016	Moscow, Russia	Powerlifting	raw	−75 kg	master
1	GPA World Championships	8–11 Dec 2016	Moscow, Russia	Squat	raw	−75 kg	master
1	GPA World Championships	8–11 Dec 2016	Moscow, Russia	Push&Pull	raw	−75 kg	master
1	GPA World Championships	8–11 Dec 2016	Moscow, Russia	Push&Pull	raw	−75 kg	open
1	WUAP European Championships	12–17 June 2017	Telfs, Austria	Powerlifting	raw	−75 kg	master
1	WUAP World Championships	17–22 October 2017	Prague, Czech Republic	Bench press	raw	−75 kg	master
1	WUAP World Championships	17–22 October 2017	Prague, Czech Republic	Powerlifting	raw	−75 kg	master
1	WPA World Championships	15–20 May 2018	Lutsk, Ukraine	Powerlifting	raw	−75 kg	master
1	WPA World Championships	15–20 May 2018	Lutsk, Ukraine	Deadlift	raw	−75 kg	master
1	WPC European Championships	23–29 June 2018	Le Pont-de-Claix, France	Powerlifting	raw	−75 kg	master
1	WUAP World Championships	15–21 October 2018	Trnava, Slovakia	Powerlifting	raw	−75 kg	master
1	WUAP World Championships	15–21 October 2018	Trnava, Slovakia	Deadlift	raw	−82,5 kg	master
1	IPL World Championships	7–9 December 2018	Saint Petersburg, Russia	Powerlifting	raw (sleeves)	−75 kg	master
1	IPL World Championships	7–9 December 2018	Saint Petersburg, Russia	Push&Pull	raw	−75 kg	master
1	IPL World Championships	7–9 December 2018	Saint Petersburg, Russia	Push&Pull	raw	−75 kg	open
1	IPL World Championships	7–9 December 2018	Saint Petersburg, Russia	Deadlift	raw	−75 kg	master
1	WUAP European Championships	17–22 June 2019	Frauenau, Germany	Powerlifting	raw	−75 kg	master
1	IPL World Championships	18–20 October 2019	Leipzig, Germany	Powerlifting	raw	−75 kg	master
1	IPL World Championships	18–20 October 2019	Leipzig, Germany	Deadlift	raw	−75 kg	master

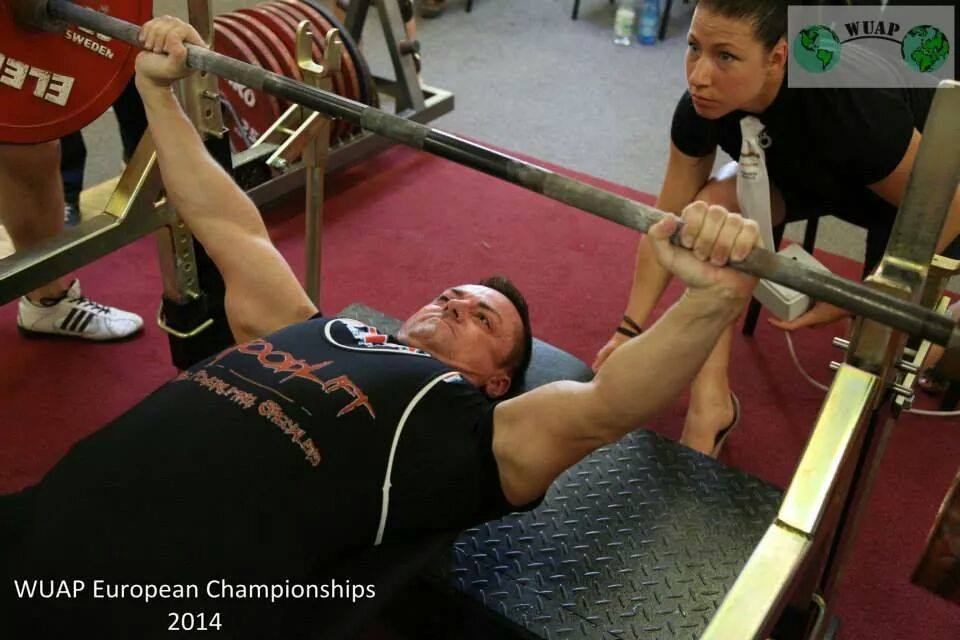
Erni Gregorčič at the 2014 European Championship in Prešov, Slovakia

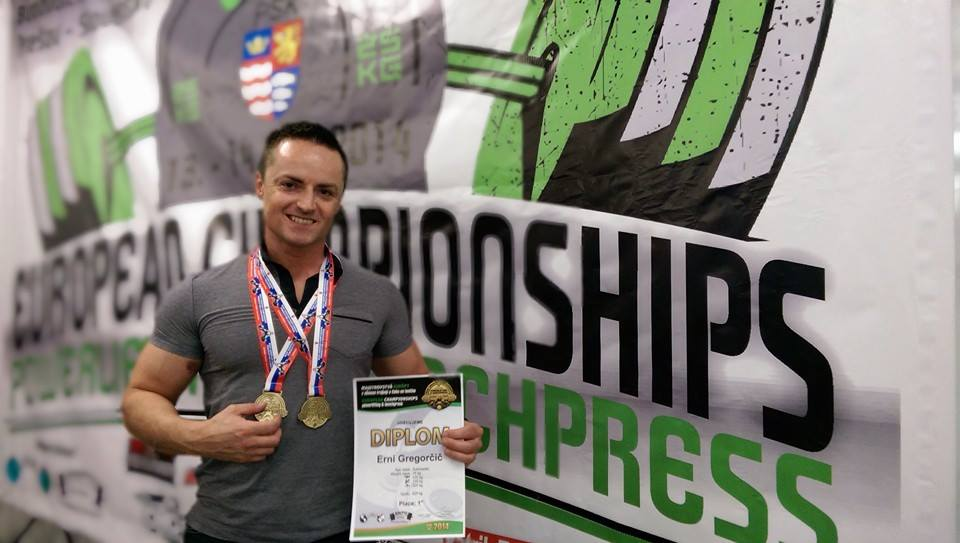
Erni Gregorčič after the medal ceremony at the 2014 European Championship in Prešov, Slovakia

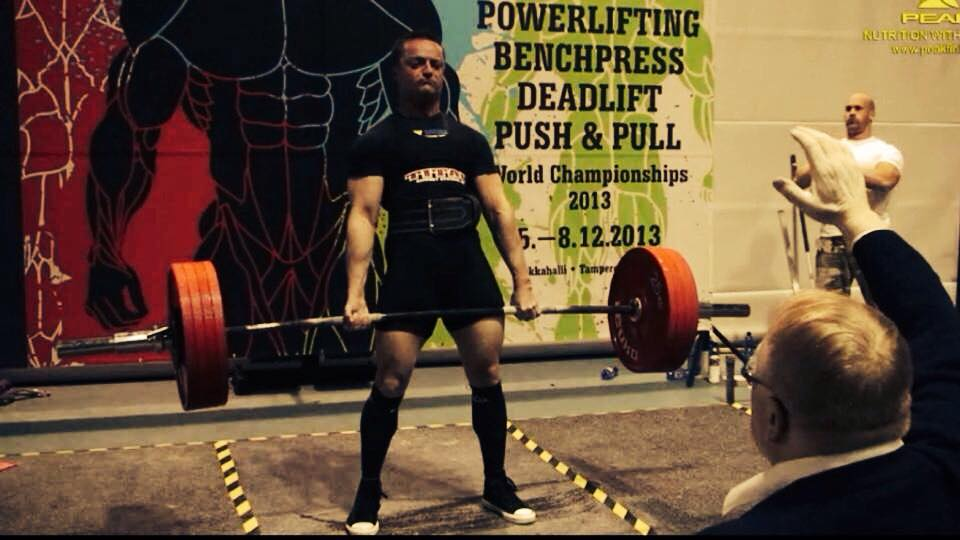
Deadlift at the 2013 World Championship in Tampere, Finland

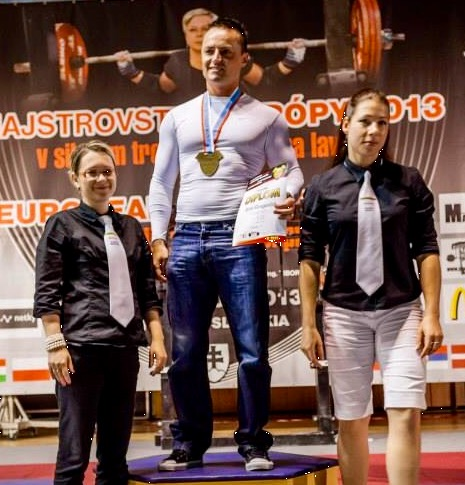
Erni Gregorčič at the 2013 European Championship medal ceremony in Trnava, Slovakia

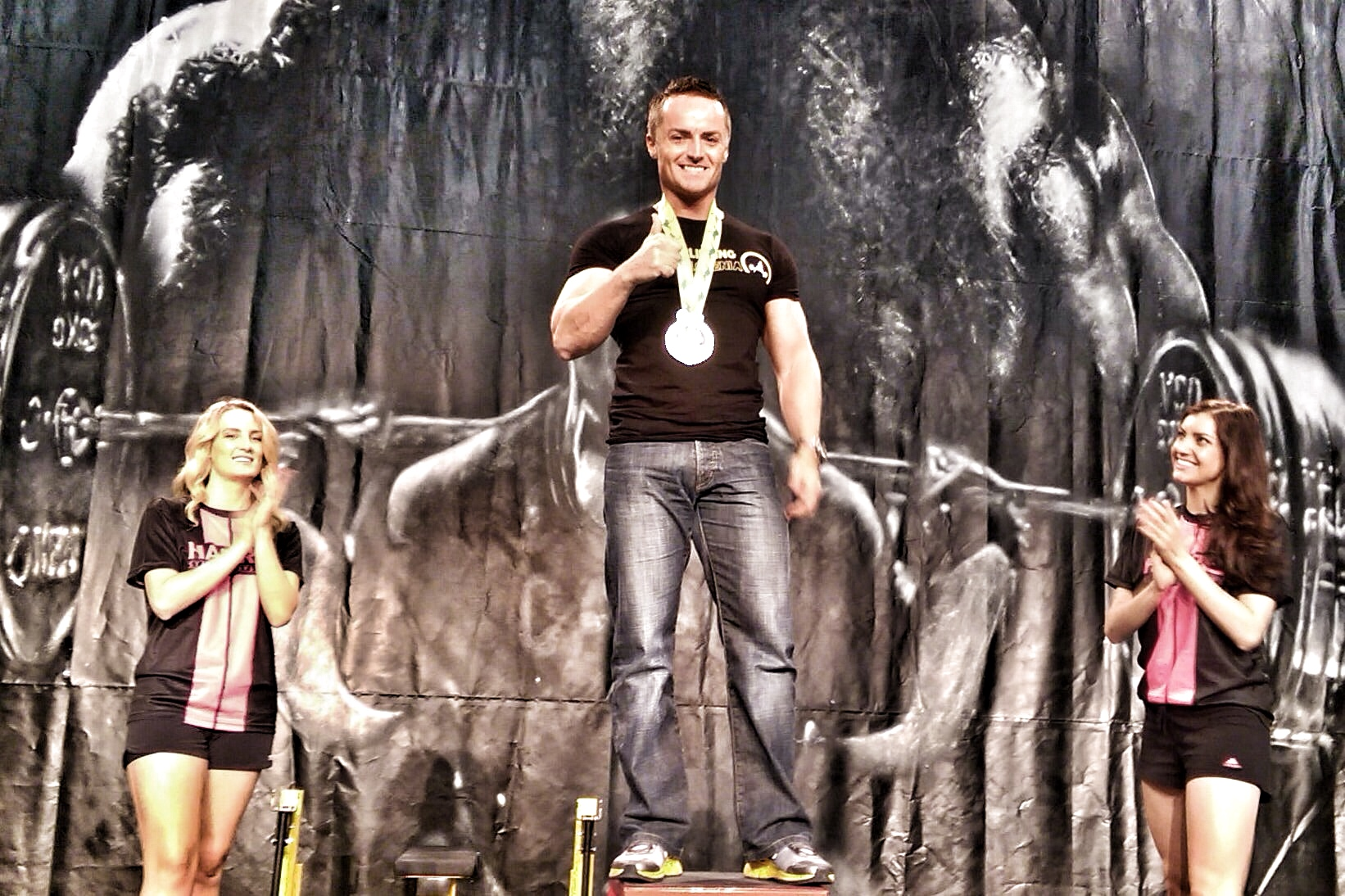
Erni Gregorčič at the 2014 World Championship award ceremony in Sydney, Australia

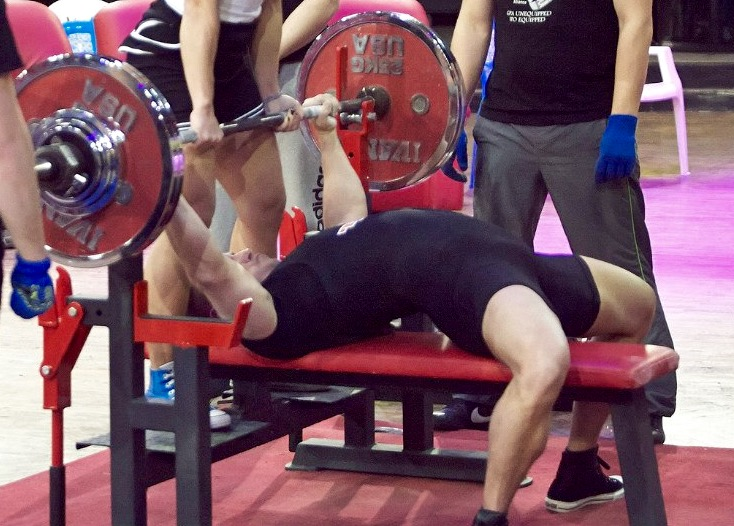
Bench press at the 2014 European Championship in Kyiv, Ukraine

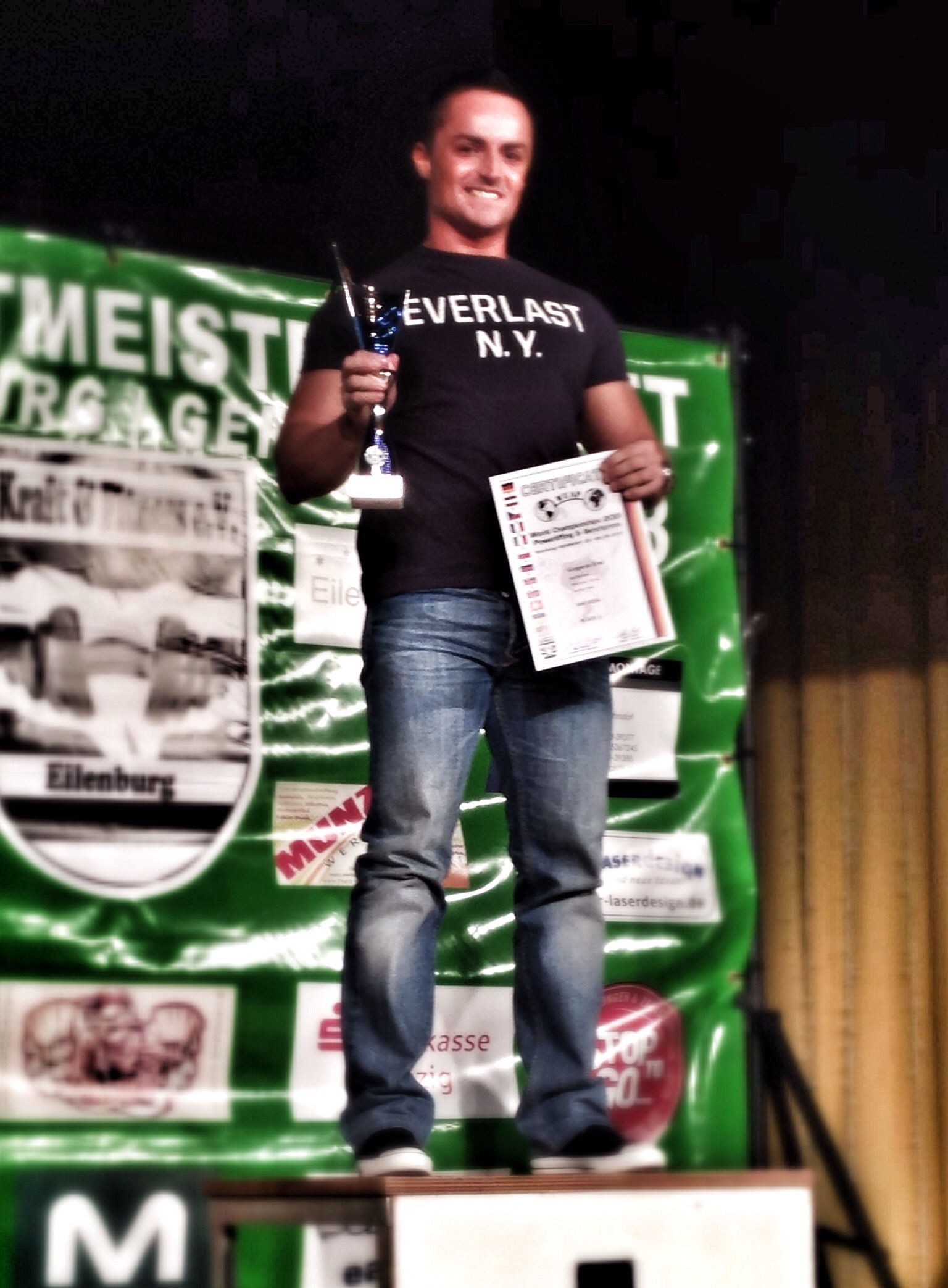
Erni Gregorčič at the 2013 World Championship medal ceremony in Eilenburg, Germany

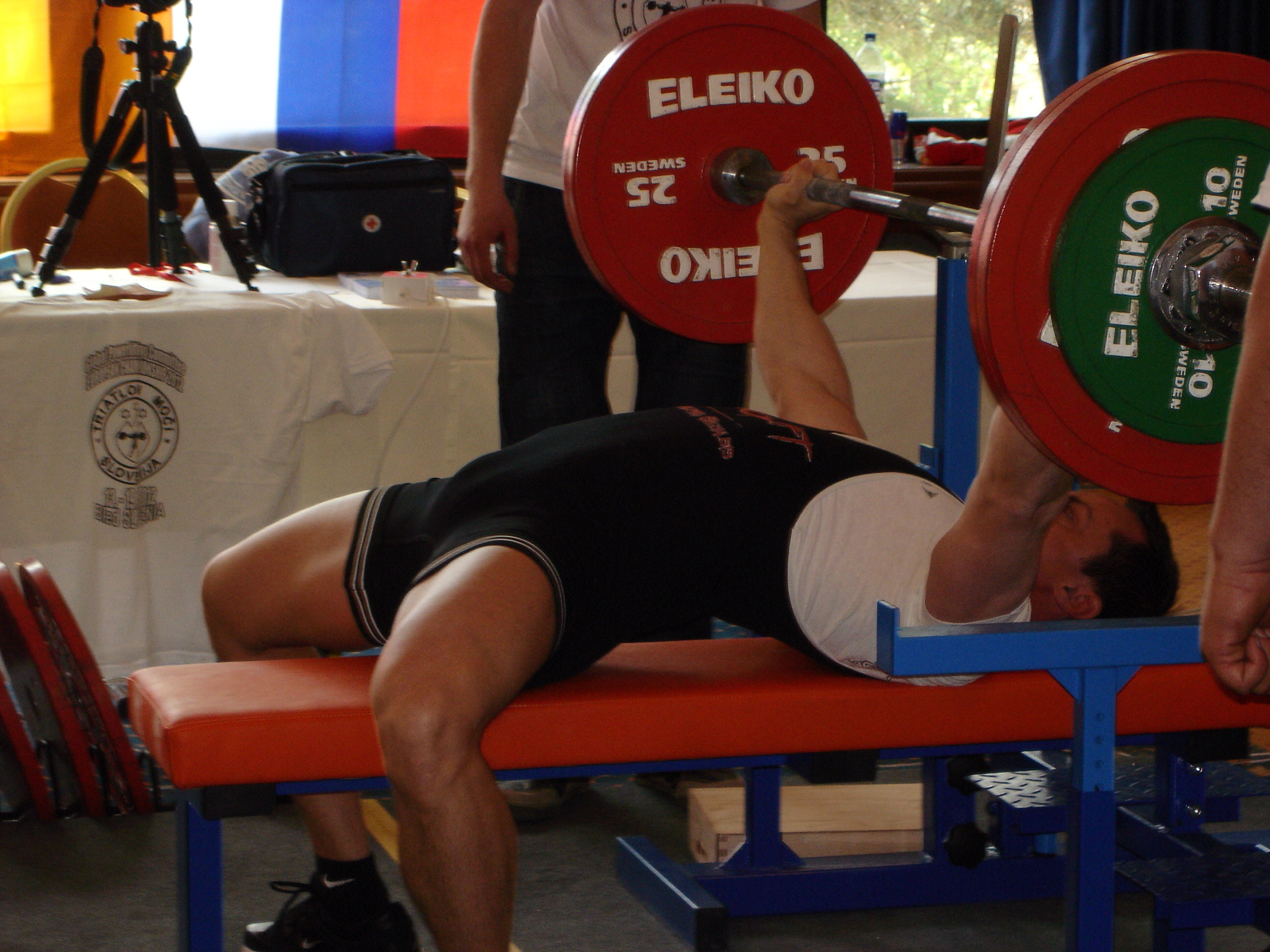
Bench press at the 2012 European Championship in Bled, Slovenia

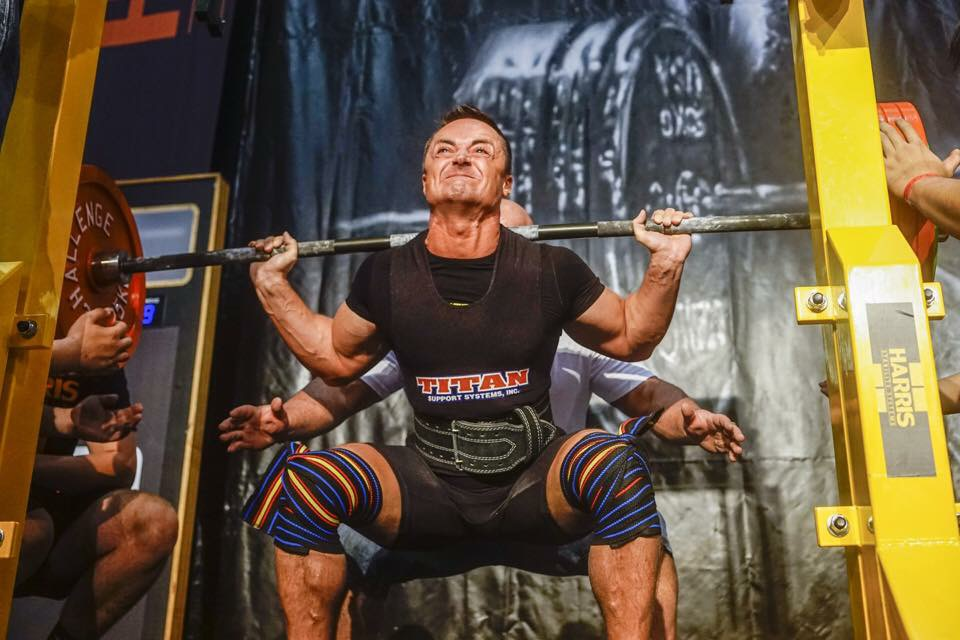
Erni Gregorčič at the 2014 World Championship in Sydney, Australia
