= Lorenz Erni =

Swiss lawyer

Lorenz Erni (born 1950 in Zürich) is a Swiss lawyer and a partner at the Zürich law firm of Eschmann & Erni. He studied at the University of Zürich, the University of Hamburg (Germany), and obtained a doctorate of law in 1974. He specializes in criminal law, and speaks German (native), English, French, Italian and Dutch.

In September 2009, he was hired to represent Roman Polanski, after Polanski was arrested in Switzerland on a warrant related to a 1978 conviction of engaging in unlawful sexual intercourse with a minor. Back in 1978, Polanski had pleaded guilty to the charge but left the United States before sentencing, and never returned. Polanski has announced his intention to appeal extradition in the Swiss courts.
