= Ernie Suggs =

American journalist (born 1967)

- Born: March 18, 1967 (age 59); New York City, U.S.
- Education: North Carolina Central University
- Occupation: Journalist
- Employer: The Atlanta Journal-Constitution
- Website: https://www.ajc.com/staff/ernie-suggs/

Ernie Suggs (born March 18, 1967) is an American journalist with The Atlanta Journal-Constitution who writes about race and culture. He also writes about the Carter Center and former President Jimmy Carter. He oversees AJC Sepia, the newspaper's Black news curation site and the Unapologetically ATL newsletter. He has written about people and history of the civil rights movement and the challenges faced by historically black colleges and universities.

== Early life and education ==
He was born in Brooklyn and raised in Rocky Mount, North Carolina. Suggs graduated in 1985 from Rocky Mount Senior High School. Suggs is a 1990 graduate of North Carolina Central University, with an English Literature degree. He was editor and sports editor of The Campus Echo and a member of the Alpha Phi Alpha fraternity In 2009, Suggs was also a Harvard University Nieman Fellow

== Journalism career ==
Suggs joined The Atlanta Journal-Constitution in 1997 and writes about race and culture, as well as a variety of breaking national news and investigative stories. He has been the paper's primary civil rights reporter, covering activists including Coretta Scott King, Joseph E. Lowery, C. T. Vivian, Hosea Williams, and Andrew Young. In 2014, he wrote about the protests in Ferguson, Mo. after the shooting of Michael Brown. He also writes about the Carter Center and former President Jimmy Carter. Since 2016, he has managed the AJC's Black History Month project through AJC Sepia, the paper's Black news curation site. He previously reported for Gannett Newspapers in New York City and The Herald-Sun in Durham, North Carolina. In 1996, while at The Herald-Sun, he was awarded a fellowship through the Education Writers Association. As part of the fellowship, in 1997 he published "Fighting to Survive: Historically Black Colleges and Universities Face the 21st Century"," an in-depth examination of HBCUs.

== Books ==
The Many Lives of Andrew Young. (March 2022) ISBN 978-1-58838-474-4

=== Other awards and honors ===
His 1997 "Fighting to Survive" series won Suggs the Journalist of the Year Award from the American Association of University Professors; First Place, Salute to Excellence Journalism Award for Investigative Reporting from the National Association of Black Journalists; Journalist of the Year from the North Carolina Black Publishers Association; and Journalist of the Year from the North Carolina Press Association. In 2018, Suggs and Eric Stirgus wrote a series about HBCUs for The Atlanta Journal-Constitution.

Suggs was a 2009 Harvard University Nieman Fellow. He is a member of the Nieman Foundation's Board of Trustees and the former national vice president of the National Association of Black Journalists. He received a Pioneer Black Journalist Award from the Atlanta Association of Black Journalists in 2013. He has been a judge for the National Headliner Awards.
