= Ern Pedler =

American novelist

Ernest Joseph "Ern" Pedler (May 31, 1914 – November 17, 1989) was a writer whose work was based on his experiences as a distance-riding horseman and wild horse-chasing cowboy. He published one book, The Big Lonely Horse (1958), and two serialized novellas, Trail to Freedom (1959) and Dust of the Home Corral (1961). His many short stories and articles are listed below.

== Biography ==
Ern Pedler was born on May 31, 1914, in the Adelaide suburb of Prospect. The following year his parents emigrated with their children to the American state of Utah. There, he grew up in the mouth of Big Cottonwood Canyon. A neighbor who was a hard riding "mountain man" taught him horsemanship and mountain riding on mustangs. When Pedler was sixteen years old, he quit school and spent the winter alone in the mountains. By the time he was in his mid-thirties, he had established a reputation on the trail and as a fearless mustanger. George B. Russell's classic Hoofprints in Time, includes a lengthy segment about Pedler and his Morgan stallion Flying Jubilee.

In 1951, Amos Mosher described some of Pedler's exploits to magazine editor Sumner Kean who then asked Pedler to send descriptions of what he was doing. For many years thereafter, the magazine published Pedler's articles and short stories. Despite his lack of extensive formal education, he was a literate and engaging writer. Like the work of Will James and Ben K. Green, his stories read as if they were written from the saddle. They exude gritty authenticity and good humor. The plots tend to focus on long rides, mustanging, and cattle work in the vast expanses of the Mountain West. His writing is not as well known as that of James and Green because almost all of his stories and articles were published in a national magazine with a readership of only a few thousand, The Morgan Horse, (“TMH”). Through his personal example and his writing, Pedler influenced others. Because of him, some people chose Morgan horses, became trail riders, or attempted to write. Pedler died on November 17, 1989. His obituary's only words regarding what he did in life are: “He was a horseman, and he rode good horses.”

== Quotations ==
“He could find his way over a knoll pocked with badger holes and scarcely miss a stride, and he could jump a double wash on a run, lighting on the fin between like a cat on a fence.” (Pedler's quote about his Flying Jubilee stallion in George B. Russell's Hoofprints in Time, A.S. Barnes & Co., NY, 1966.)

“Nothing takes the eagerness out of a mustanging horse like a few hard runs without a catch.” (From “Decay of Age,” TMH, March, 1960, p. 39)

“The buckskin stayed behind those ponies all the way, forcing their lead, outguessing them, and outrunning them in their own land.” (About his horse Buck in The Big Lonely Horse, Eusey Press, Leominister, 1960, p. 19)

“I wonder how people jammed into the big cities find any real happiness or solitude where they can’t see a mountain, or hear a clear stream, or feel the comfort of a good saddle, and I suppose they think people like me are a little cracked.” (From the preface to “The Silver-tipped Mustang,” TMH, November, 1952 p. 6)

“Flying Jubilee is dead, and some of me went with him.” (The closing words of Pedler's report on the passing of Flying Jubilee, “Flying Jubilee Is Dead,” TMH, June, 1966, p. 61)

== Bibliography ==
- The Big Lonely Horse, Eusey Press, Leominister (1960)-book,
- Trail to Freedom, (1959) TMH, January–June, 1959-novella
- Dust of the Home Corral, TMH, January–May, 1961-novella

Short Stories

- Two Days, The Morgan Horse (“TMH”), February and March, 1952, p. 8
- The Silver-Tipped Mustang, TMH, November, 1952, p. 6
- The Song and the Star, TMH, December, 1952, p. 24
- The Poacher, December, TMH, 1953, p. 10
- “The Christmas Groom,” TMH, December, 1954. p. 10
- “Lights of Home,” TMH, May, 1955, p. 6
- “A Narrow Margin,” TMH, January, 1956, p. 6
- “No Cheers to Push Him On,” TMH, March, 1957, p. 8
- “Beyond the Tall Mountains” TMH, March, 1958
- “Oh Little Town,” TMH, December, 1959, p. 7
- “Deep Dust and Tall Hills,” TMH, April, 1963, p. 8
- Feed My Sheep, TMH, December, 1963, p. 8
- Unto Us a Child Is Born, TMH, December, 1965, p. 11
- “Morgan Man,” TMH, July, 1966. p. 12
- “The Dream Never Ends,” TMH, August, 1984, p. 78

Articles

- “Wild Horse Chase,” TMH, December, 1951, p. 10
- “The Horse Hunters,” TMH, March, 1954, p. 10
- “Colt Run,” TMH, April, 1955, p. 6
- “Once Upon a Horse,” TMH, April, 1955, p. 42
- “My Good Friend Hennery,” TMH, September, 1955, p. 12
- “A Horse for Hennery,” TMH, December, 1955, p. 8
- “A Man Buys a Horse, TMH, September, 1956, p. 10
- “Another Wild Horse Chase,” TMH, 1956
- “The Western Morgan,” Western Horseman, May, 1957, p. 53
- “Miles Beyond,” TMH, 1958, p. 9
- “Decay of Age,” TMH, March, 1960, p. 6
- “How Gray was My Flannel Suit, TMH, March, 1962, p. 8
- “Flying Jubilee Is Dead,” TMH, June, 1966, p. 6
