= Ernst (surname) =

Ernst is a surname, and may refer to:

== A–J ==
- Adolf Ernst (1832–1899), Venezuelan botanist
- Alfred Ernst (1875–1968), Swiss botanist
- Alice Henson Ernst (1880–1980), American dramatist
- Alwin C. Ernst (1881–1948), American businessman
- Andy Ernst, American musician
- Annika Ernst (born 1982), German actress
- Anton Ernst, South African-born film producer
- Austin Ernst (born 1992), American professional golfer
- Bastian Ernst (born 1987), German politician
- Bernard M. L. Ernst (1879–1938), American lawyer and magician
- Bettina Ernst (born 1968), Swiss gymnast
- Bob Ernst, American rowing coach
- Britta Ernst (born 1961), German politician
- Carl H. Ernst (1938–2018), American herpetologist
- Carl W. Ernst (born 1950), American Islamic studies scholar
- Carley Ernst (born 1994), Australian basketball player
- Caroline Ernst (1819–1902), American settler
- Charlie Ernst, American soccer player
- Chris Ernst (born 1953/54), American rower
- Chris Ernst (cyclist) (born 1999), Canadian cyclist
- Christian Hansen Ernst (1660–1694), Norwegian civil servant
- Christina Ernst, American engineer and social media creator
- Christoph Ernst, German civil servant
- Cornelia Ernst (born 1956), German politician and Member of the European Parliament
- Cornelius Ernst (1924–1977), Sri Lankan Dominican theologian
- Derek Ernst (born 1990), American professional golfer
- Didier Ernst (born 1971), Belgian footballer
- Dominik Ernst (born 1990), German footballer
- Donald W. Ernst (1934–2023), American film producer
- Edzard Ernst (born 1948), German academic physician and researcher
- Emil Ernst (1889–1942), German astronomer
- Erik Ernst, Danish computer scientist
- Ernie Ernst (1924–2013), American judge
- Eugen Ernst (1864–1954), German politician
- Eunice Katherine M. Ernst (1926–2021), American nurse midwife
- Fabian Ernst (born 1979), German footballer
- Fedir Ernst (1891–1942), Ukrainian art historian
- Franz Ernst (born 1938), Danish film director
- Frederica Louise Ernst (1714–1781), Danish slave trader and ship owner
- Frederick T. Ernst (1922–2020), American politician
- George Ernst (1788–1853), Canadian politician and merchant
- Gianina Ernst (born 1998), German ski jumper
- Graham Ernst (1940–2026), Australian politician
- Gregg Ernst (born 1961), Canadian strength athlete
- Gundolf Ernst (1930–2002), German geologist and mineralogist
- Gustav Ernst (born 1944), Austrian playwright, novelist and screenwriter
- Heinrich Wilhelm Ernst (1812–1865), Moravian-Jewish violinist, violist and composer
- Henrik Ernst (footballer) (born 1986), German footballer
- Henrik Ernst (jurist) (1603–1665), German-Danish jurist and philologist
- Holger Ernst (born 1972), German film director
- Hubertus Ernst (1917–2017), Dutch Catholic bishop
- Hugo Ernst (1876–1954), Croatian-born American labor union leader
- Jack Ernst (1899–1968), American football player
- Jim Ernst (born 1942), Canadian politician
- Jimmy Ernst (1920–1984), American painter
- Joanne Ernst, American triathlete
- Johan Bertram Ernst (1663–1722), Danish chief of police
- Johan Conrad Ernst (1666–1750), Danish architect and master builder
- Johanna Ernst (born 1992), Austrian rock climber
- Joni Ernst (born 1970), American politician and military officer
- Joseph Roland Ernst (1937–1962), Second-to-last person executed in New Jersey
- Juliette Ernst (1900–2001), Swiss classical philologist

== K–W ==
- K.S. Ernst (born 1946), American poet and artist
- Kajsa Ernst (born 1962), Swedish actress
- Karl Ernst (1904–1934), German SA leader
- Ken Ernst (1918–1985), American cartoonist
- Klaus Ernst (born 1954), German politician
- Konstantin Ernst (born 1961), Russian media manager, producer and TV host
- Lajos Ernst (1872–1937), Hungarian collector
- Leila Ernst (1920–1970), American actress
- Lillie Rose Ernst (1870–1943), American educator
- Manuela Ernst (born 1985), Swiss politician
- Max Ernst (1891–1976), German artist
- Meinrad Ernst (1925–2019), Swiss wrestler
- Mensen Ernst (1795–1843), Norwegian distance runner
- Mike Ernst (born 1950), American football player
- Morris Ernst (1888–1976), American attorney
- Norbert Ernst (born 1977), Austrian operatic tenor
- Ole Ernst (1940–2013), Danish actor
- Oswald Herbert Ernst (1842–1926), Chief of Staff of the United States Army from 1914 to 1917
- Otto Ernst (1898-1940), Chilean footballer
- Paul Ernst (German writer) (1866–1933), German writer, dramatist, critic, and journalist
- Paul Ernst (American writer) (1899–1985), American novelist
- Paul Ernst (biathlete) (1935–2024), Austrian biathlete
- Paul Ernst (pathologist) (1859–1937), Swiss pathologist
- Peyton Ernst (born 1997), American artistic gymnast
- Priscilla Ernst (born 1971), Dutch speed skater
- Rainer Ernst (born 1961), German footballer
- Rhys Ernst, American filmmaker
- Ricardo Ernst (born 1959), Venezuelan-American academic and author
- Richard P. Ernst (1858–1934), American politician
- Richard R. Ernst (1933–2021), Swiss physical chemist and Nobel laureate
- Ron Ernst (born 1957), American football player and coach
- Ronny Ernst (born 1976), German former footballer
- Rudolf Ernst (1854–1932), Austro-French painter and printmaker
- Rudolf Ernst (banker) (1865–1956), Swiss banker
- Sam Ernst, American television writer and producer
- Santiago Ernst (1893–1944), Chilean accountant and politician
- Sebastian Ernst (born 1984), German sprinter
- Sebastian Ernst (footballer) (born 1995), German footballer
- Sheila Ernst (1941–2015), British psychotherapist
- Siegrid Ernst (1929–2022), German pianist and composer
- Simon Ernst (born 1994), German handball player
- Sipke Ernst (born 1979), Dutch chess grandmaster
- Susan G. Ernst, American biologist
- Thom Ernst, Canadian television host
- Thomas Ernst (born 1967), German footballer
- Tiarna Ernst (born 1988), Australian rules footballer
- Tjark Ernst (born 2003), German footballer
- Tony Ernst (born 1966), Swedish journalist and writer
- W. G. Ernst (born 1931), American geologist
- Wallace Roy Ernst (1928–1971), American botanist
- Walter Ernst (1899–1945), German lawyer and Nazi politician
- Waltraud Ernst (born 1955), German medical historian
- Wilhelm Ernst (1905–1952), German chess player
- William Gordon Ernst (1897–1939), Canadian politician
- Wolfgang Ernst (born 1956), German lawyer and academic
- Wolfgang Ernst (media theorist) (born 1959), German media scholar and historian

== See also ==
- Earnest (surname)
