= Earnest =

Earnest is a masculine given name and a surname which may refer to:

== Given name ==
- Earnest Andersson (1878–1943), American polymath
- Earnest Brown IV (born 1999), American football player
- Earnest Byner (born 1962), American football player
- Earnest Elmo Calkins (1868–1964), American early advertising innovator
- Earnest Sevier Cox (1880–1966), American Methodist preacher
- Earnest Frank, American football coach
- Earnest Graham (born 1980), American football player
- Earnest Gray (born 1957), American football player
- Earnest Greene (born 2003), American football player
- Earnest Hooton (1887–1954), American physical anthropologist
- Ernie Hudson (born 1945), American actor
- Earnest Jackson (born 1959), American football player
- Earnest Mudzengi, Zimbabwean politician
- Earnest Pugh, American gospel singer-songwriter
- Earnest Rhone (born 1953), former NFL linebacker
- Earnest Ross (born 1991), American professional basketball player
- Earnest James Ujaama (born 1965), American Muslim social activist
- Earnest Wilson, American football coach

== Surname ==
- Earnest (surname)

== See also ==
- Ernest (disambiguation)
