= Earnest (disambiguation) =

Earnest is a given name and a surname. It may also refer to:

- Earnest, Kansas, a ghost town
- Earnest Bridge, a bridge near Marcola, Oregon, United States
- HMS Earnest, three British Royal Navy ships
- Earnest-class destroyer, a Royal Navy class
- Earnest (company), an American student loan provider

== See also ==
- Earnestville (disambiguation)
