= Ernest (surname) =

Ernest is a surname, and may refer to:

- Aaron Ernest (born 1993), American sprinter
- Ernest Pignon-Ernest (born 1942), French artist
- George Ernest (1921–2009), American actor
- Ian Ernest (born 1954), Mauritian Anglican bishop
- James Ernest (born 1968), American game designer
- John Ernest (1922–1994), American constructivist artist
- Jonathan Ernest, Mauritian footballer
- Justin Ernest (born 1972), American football player
- Paul Ernest (born 1944), American philosopher and educational theorist, son of John Ernest

== See also ==
- Earnest (surname)
- Ernst (surname)
