= Arun Chaudhary =

American journalist (born 1975)

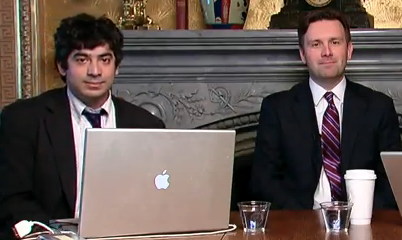
- West Wing Week - Arun Chaudhary and Josh Earnest
- Born: November 6, 1975 (age 51); New York City, U.S.
- Education: Cornell University (BA); New York University (MFA)
- Spouse: Laura Moser

Arun Chaudhary (born November 6, 1975) is an American political operative and filmmaker. After serving on President Barack Obama's 2008 presidential campaign, he was asked to become the first official videographer of the White House, a position he held from 2009-2011. He left in August 2011 to join mobile-messaging startup Revolution Messaging as senior vice president of communications. He later served as Creative Director for Senator Bernie Sanders' 2016 presidential campaign.

Chaudhary is perhaps best known for his ability to bring art into the world of political campaigns. In an interview with Disruption Magazine, David Axelrod, his manager from the 2008 presidential campaign, said, “We hired Chaudhary for his artistic eye... He was able to contribute a compelling and authentic story to voters and that proved invaluable.”

== First Cameraman ==
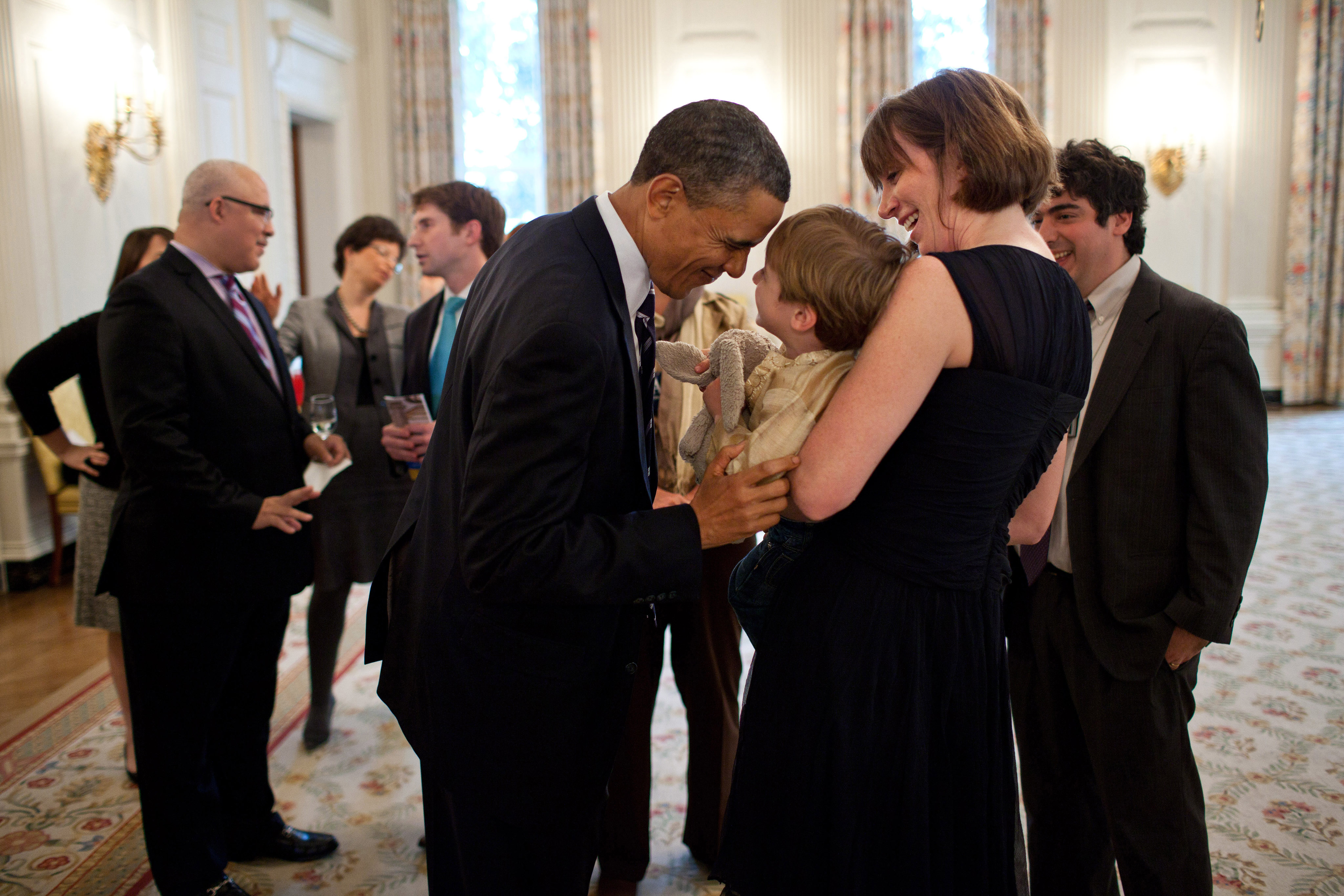
President Obama with Arun, his wife Laura Moser and son Leo in 2011

His first book, First Cameraman: Documenting the Obama Presidency in Real Time, was published in August 2012 by Times Books. In The Washington Post, Rutgers University professor David Greenberg said "Its singular, quirky take on Obama's brief career adds a smidgen of useful information to the historical record." The Atlantic's Nancy Scola, in reviewing the book, observed that "Chaudhary writes with the looseness of someone whose political experience consists of being told to tell stories, which means there's plenty of gossipy bits for campaign enthusiasts."

The book was also reviewed by NPR's Morning Edition, Kirkus Reviews, Booklist, Publishers Weekly.

== Personal life ==
Chaudhary was born November 6, 1975. His parents and older sister are both computer scientists; his younger brother, Ajay Singh Chaudhary (academic), founded the Brooklyn Institute for Social Research. His father is an Indian immigrant and his mother is Jewish.

He has a B.A. from Cornell University and an MFA from New York University, and has worked as a writer, director, location sound recordist, post-production sound designer, and film critic. He is a former New York University film professor. While at Cornell University, he was the bassist and vocalist of punk rock band IFarm.

Chaudhary is married to Laura Moser, founder of Daily Action, a digital messaging site that caters to liberal causes highlighted during the Trump administration. Laura was a candidate in the Democratic primary for Texas Congressional District 7, held by John Culberson, but lost the nomination to Lizzie Fletcher, who later defeated Culberson in the November 2018 midterm election.
