= Ernst (disambiguation) =

Ernst is both a surname and a given name, the German, Dutch, and Scandinavian form of Ernest.

Ernst may also refer to:

- Ernst, Germany, a municipality in the Rhineland-Palatinate
- Ernst (album), an album by Matt Nathanson
- Ernst (comics), a Marvel Comics mutant character
- Herzog Ernst, German medieval epic
- Ernst & Young, professional services and accounting firm
- Ernst Home Centers, a defunct hardware chain

== See also ==
- Ernest (disambiguation)
