= SCMR =

SCMR may refer to:

- Macedo-Romanian Cultural Society (Societatea de Cultură Macedo-Română), an Aromanian cultural organization in Romania
- Supply Chain Management Review, a United States-based business management magazine
