= Eric Schultz =

American political advisor (born 1980)

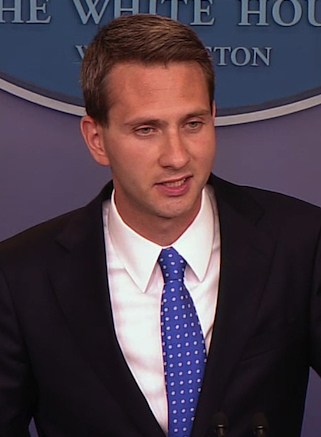

White House Deputy Press Secretary
- In office June 20, 2014 – January 20, 2017
- President: Barack Obama
- Secretary: Josh Earnest
- Preceded by: Josh Earnest
- Succeeded by: Sarah Huckabee Sanders

Personal details
- Born: 1980 (age 45–46) Syracuse, New York, U.S.
- Party: Democratic
- Education: Washington University in St. Louis (BA)

Eric Schultz (born 1980) is an American political advisor who served as Deputy White House Press Secretary in the Obama administration from 2014 to 2017. Recognized by Politico as the strategist "White House officials turn to in a crisis to handle communications", Schultz was originally hired at the White House in 2011 to respond to congressional oversight investigations.

== Early life and education ==
Schultz graduated Jamesville-DeWitt High School in 1998 before earning a Bachelor of Arts degree from the Washington University in St. Louis, where he studied political science and writing. Schultz is the son of Sybil and Jack Schultz, a long time judge in Dewitt, NY. He has two brothers.

== Career ==
Schultz got his start in politics as an opposition researcher and tracker on then-First Lady Hillary Clinton's 2000 Senate campaign. In 2004, he managed communications efforts for John Kerry in New Hampshire, where Kerry won in both the primary and general elections. Schultz spent several years on Capitol Hill working for a number of U.S. senators, including Chuck Schumer (D-NY).

In 2008, he served as the national press secretary for John Edwards’ presidential campaign before working as Deputy Campaign Manager for Al Franken during the 2008 United States Senate election in Minnesota. According to the Washington Post, Schultz brought “order and discipline” to Franken's campaign, working closely with the consultant team on television spots, direct mail, and an aggressive press strategy that kept a favored incumbent opponent on defense and sank his approval ratings. During a high-profile recount, Schultz worked directly with the chief counsel to devise messaging that augmented the campaign's legal strategy.

Before joining the White House, Schultz served as communications director for the Democratic Senatorial Campaign Committee in 2010, retaining Senate control for Democrats despite an historic Republican wave. In this role, Schultz became “well-known among Washington reporters for his aggressive, behind-the-scenes approach,” as noted by Politico.

After White House Deputy Press Secretary Josh Earnest replaced Jay Carney to become White House Press Secretary in 2014, Schultz was appointed White House Deputy Press Secretary. In this role, Schultz often diffused "tensions with humor. But he [could] be relentless in pushing his message in both public and private conversations.” Former White House Communications Director Jen Psaki compared Schultz to fictional crisis manager Olivia Pope, "he's the person you want next to you in a foxhole when there's a crisis." At the end of President Obama's second term, former White House Senior Advisor Valerie Jarrett said of Schultz, “We’ve all grown to rely on his wise counsel" and that the President "trusts his sound judgement."

In January 2017, Schultz founded the Schultz Group, a strategic communications firm where he continues to advise President Obama. Drawing on his experiences in politics, media, and Washington, Schultz has consulted for numerous television and film projects, including TV pilots and major motion picture scripts. Schultz was credited as a consultant on Designated Survivor and season four of Succession.
