= Laura Moser =

American author from Texas

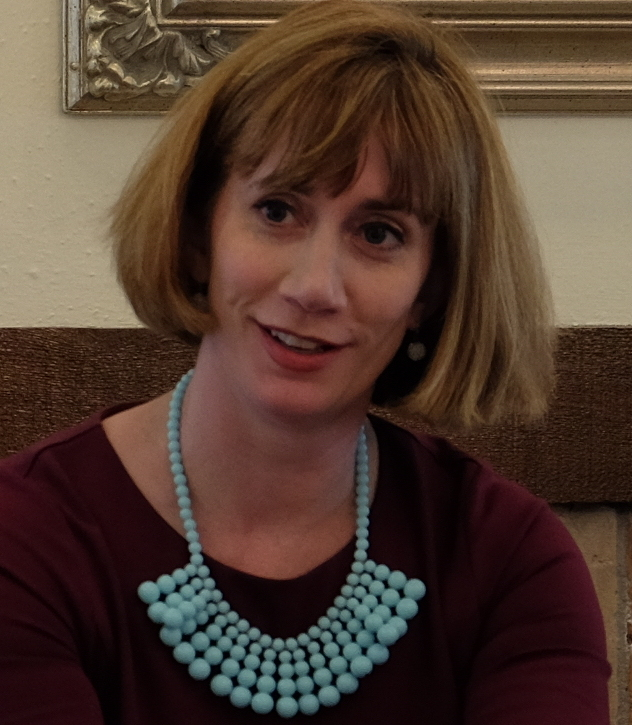

Personal details
- Born: August 30, 1977 (age 49) Houston, Texas, U.S.
- Party: Democratic
- Education: Amherst College (BA)

Laura Moser is an American author who founded the anti-Trump resistance movement Daily Action. She was a candidate for the United States Congress in Texas's 7th congressional district.

== Early life and education ==
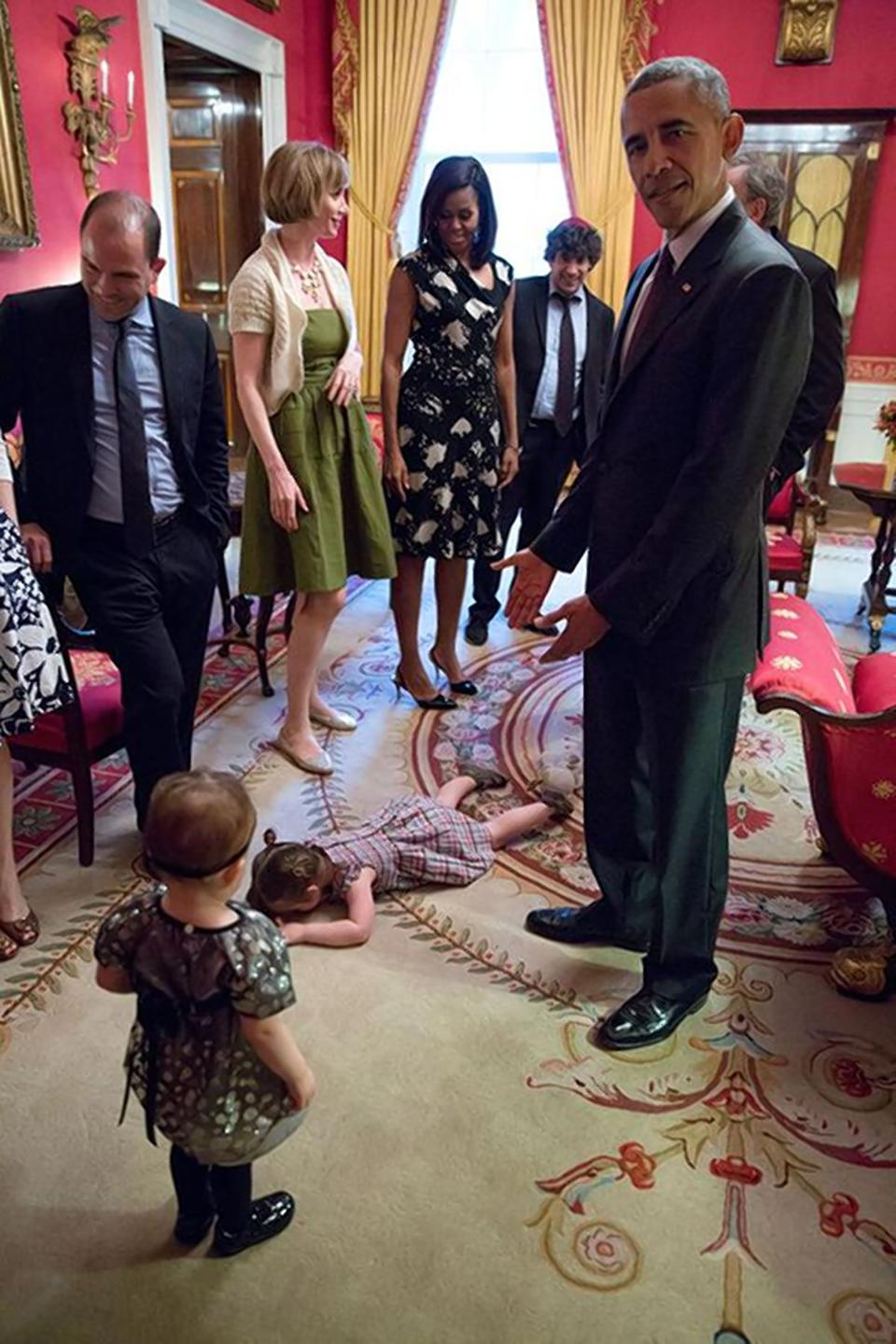
Moser's daughter Claudia throws a tantrum at a 2015 White House Passover dinner as she, her husband Arun and the Obamas look on

Moser was born in Houston, Texas. Her grandfather arrived in Houston in 1942 as a Jewish refugee from Nazi Germany.

Moser attended St. John's School in Houston, and graduated from Amherst College in 1999. She later worked in publishing at the Harvill Press in London before becoming a freelance journalist. Moser is Jewish.

== Publications and career ==
Moser published her first book, an "efficient, compact" biography of the actress Bette Davis, in 2005. With her friend Lauren Mechling, she co-authored a series of young adult novels about the experiences of a girl who moves from Houston to Brooklyn.

Moser has contributed to The New York Times, The Wall Street Journal, Vogue, and The Jewish Daily Forward. She was the education columnist at Slate.

== Political involvement ==
After the 2016 United States presidential election, Moser founded the organization Daily Action. In 2017, she moved back to Texas's 7th congressional district to run for Congress in 2018.

In February 2018, the Democratic Congressional Campaign Committee (DCCC), citing concerns about Moser's electability in the general election, called attention to her past controversial statements. That DCCC action was condemned by DNC chair Tom Perez and Our Revolution, which endorsed Moser a few days later, on March 1, 2018.

In the March 6 Democratic primary, in a seven-candidate field, Moser earned 24.3% of the vote to Lizzie Fletcher's 29.3%.

In the May 22 runoff, Fletcher defeated Moser, 68% to 32%, becoming the Democratic nominee in the general election.

In the November 6 general election, Fletcher defeated incumbent representative John Culberson by five percentage points (52.5% to 47.5%).

== Personal life ==
Moser is married to Arun Chaudhary, who was President Barack Obama's White House videographer. Her brother is writer and translator Benjamin Moser. She has two children. In April 2020, she and her family moved to Berlin, Germany.
