= Ricardo Ernst =

Venezuelan-American academic and author

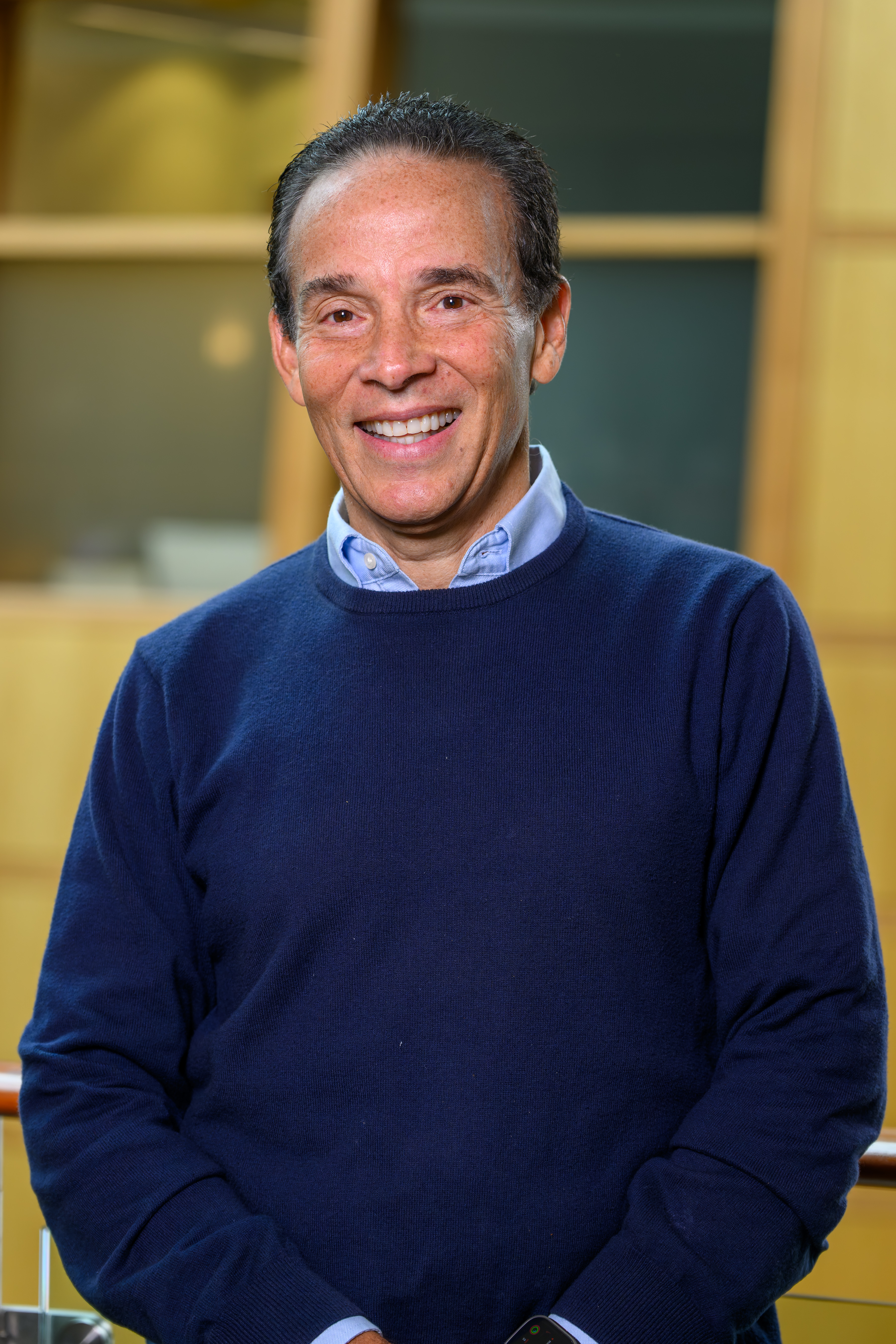
- Born: January 9, 1959 (age 67); Caracas, Venezuela
- Citizenship: American
- Occupations: Academic and author
- Years active: 1987–present
- Title: Baratta Chair in Global Business
- Awards: Outstanding American by Choice, United States Citizenship and Immigration Services (2007); The Joseph M. LeMoine Award for Undergraduate and Graduate Teaching Excellence, Georgetown University (2014); Patrick Healy Award, The Georgetown University Alumni Association (2018)

Academic background
- Education: Universidad Católica Andrés Bello (UCAB); Instituto de Estudios Superiores de Administración (I.E.S.A.); Wharton School, University of Pennsylvania

Academic work
- Sub-discipline: Global supply chains, operations and international business
- Institutions: Georgetown University

Ricardo Ernst is an American academic, and author. He is a professor at the McDonough School of Business at Georgetown University, where he holds the Baratta Chair in Global Business and is the director of the Baratta Center for Global Business and the executive director of the Latin American Leadership Program. His son, Felipe Ernst, is also a professor at Georgetown University, where he won the Tropaia Award for Most Outstanding Faculty Member in 2024.

Ernst's research is interdisciplinary in nature, with a major focus on global supply chains, operations and international business. He has co-authored and published in journals, including Management Science, Journal of Operations Management, Supply Chain Management Review and has written textbooks.

In 2007, he was recognized as an Outstanding American by Choice by the United States Citizenship and Immigration Services, a distinction awarded to naturalized U.S. citizens who have made significant contributions to their communities. He is also a two-time recipient of the Joseph M. LeMoine Award for Undergraduate and Graduate Teaching Excellence. Moreover, in 2018, he was awarded the Patrick Healy Award from Georgetown University.

== Education ==
Ernst earned his PhD in Operations and Information Management from the Wharton School of the University of Pennsylvania in 1987. His dissertation focused on distribution inventory systems in environments with multiple owners and products. He also holds an MBA from the Instituto de Estudios Superiores de Administración (I.E.S.A.) in Venezuela and a BS in Civil Engineering from Universidad Católica Andrés Bello (U.C.A.B.).

== Career ==
Ernst joined Georgetown University's McDonough School of Business in 1987 as an assistant professor. Over the years, he rose through the academic ranks, becoming a professor in 1993 and holding leadership roles within the university. He has served as deputy dean, managing director of the Latin American Board, director of the Baratta Center for Global Business and executive director of the Latin American Leadership Program (LALP).

== Research ==
Ernst is most known for his research in global supply chain management, with a focus on the strategic analysis of supply chains. His research spans multiple industries, including the semiconductor, agricultural, automotive, and soft drink sectors. He has contributed to the development of inventory control models, supply chain resilience, and performance metrics for the logistics of vaccine distribution in Latin America. Through his work, he has explored the relationship between marketing and manufacturing within the global supply chain.

=== Global supply chain resilience ===
Ernst conducted research on supply chain resilience, especially in the context of unpredictable disruptions such as the COVID-19 pandemic and geopolitical risks. His studies, conducted with scholars like Morris Cohen and Hau Lee, have provided frameworks for companies to enhance their operational flexibility and adaptability during crises.

=== Strategic supply chain design ===
Ernst has made contributions to understanding how firms can design supply chains that align with their strategic goals. He addressed challenges such as multi-echelon inventory management and supplier-manufacturing-distribution linkages.

=== Humanitarian logistics ===
Another key impact area of Ernst's work is in humanitarian logistics. He has collaborated with organizations like the Fritz Institute and Pan American Health Organization (PAHO) and contributed to the logistics of vaccine distribution in Latin America and disaster relief logistics globally.

=== Latin American ===
Ernst has been involved in developing regionally focused experiential executive education programs through Georgetown University's Latin American Leadership Program (LALP). He is also editor-in-chief of the online journal Globalization, Competitiveness and Governabilit, published by Georgetown University.

== Works ==
Ernst has co-authored and edited books focusing on global operations, supply chain resilience, and business strategy. Co-authored with Philippe-Pierre Dornier, Michel Fender, and Panos Kouvelis, his 1998 book Global Operations Management and Logistics: Text and Cases served as a guide to global operations management and logistics. In 2016, he co-authored a book titled Innovation in Emerging Markets with Jerry Haar, wherein he discussed the drivers of innovation in emerging markets and the strategies that businesses can adopt to succeed in these high-growth areas. Three years later, he co-authored another book with Jerry Haar entitled Globalization, Competitiveness and Governability: The Three Disruptive Forces of Business in the 21st Century, exploring the critical global forces of globalization, competitiveness, and governance that shape business strategies in the 21st century. His 2021 book From Me to We: How Shared Value Can Turn Companies into Engines of Change outlined how companies can adopt shared value strategies to drive social and economic change.

In 2022, Ernst co-edited a book titled Creating Values with Operations and Analytics: A Tribute to the Contributions of Professor Morris Cohen with Hau Lee, Arnd Huchzermeier, and Shiliang Cui.

== Bibliography ==
=== Books ===
- Global Operations and Logistics: Text and Cases (1998) ISBN 9780471120360
- Innovation in Emerging Markets (2016) ISBN 9781137480286
- Globalization, Competitiveness, and Governability: The Three Disruptive Forces of Business in the 21st Century (2019) ISBN 9783030175153
- From Me to We: How Shared Value Can Turn Companies into Engines of Change (2021) ISBN 9783030874230
- Creating Values with Operations and Analytics: A Tribute to the Contributions of Professor Morris Cohen (2022) ISBN 9783031088704

=== Selected articles ===
- Ernst, R., & Cohen, M. A. (1990). Operations related groups (ORGs): a clustering procedure for production/inventory systems. Journal of Operations Management, 9(4), 574–598.
- Cohen, M. A., & Ernst, R. (1988). Multi-item classification and generic inventory stock control policies. Production and Inventory Management Journal, 29(3), 6.
- Ernst, R., & Kouvelis, P. (1999). The effects of selling packaged goods on inventory decisions. Management Science, 45(8), 1142–1155.
- Ernst, R., & Kamrad, B. (2000). Evaluation of supply chain structures through modularization and postponement. European Journal of Operational Research, 124(3), 495–510.
- Cohen, M. A., Cui, S., Ernst, R., Huchzermeier, A., Kouvelis, P., Lee, H. L., ... & Tsay, A. A. (2018). OM forum—benchmarking global production sourcing decisions: Where and why firms offshore and reshore. Manufacturing & Service Operations Management, 20(3), 389–402.
- Cohen, M., Cui, S., Doetsch, S., Ernst, R., Huchzermeier, A., Kouvelis, P., ... & Tsay, A. A. (2022). Bespoke supply‐chain resilience: the gap between theory and practice. Journal of Operations Management, 68(5), 515–531.
- Niu, Y., Werle, N., Cohen, M. A., Cui, S., Deshpande, V., Ernst, R., ... & Wu, J. (2023). Global supply chain restructuring during the COVID-19 pandemic. Available at SSRN 4564927.
- Niu, Y., Werle, N., Cohen, M., Cui, S., Deshpande, V., Ernst, R., ... & Wu, J. (2024). Restructuring Global Supply Chains: Navigating the Challenges of the COVID-19 Pandemic. M&SOM-Manufacturing & Service Operations Management.
