= West Wing Week =

Web-episode released by The White House

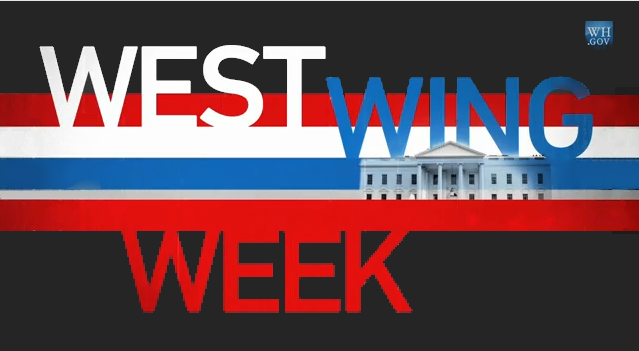
- Title sequence
- Created by: Arun Chaudhary; Josh Earnest
- Narrated by: Josh Earnest
- Country of origin: United States
- Original language: English
- No. of episodes: 388

Production
- Camera setup: Single-camera setup
- Running time: 5–7 minutes

Original release
- Network: YouTube whitehouse.gov
- Release: April 1, 2010 – January 20, 2017

West Wing Week was a weekly web-episode released by The White House about the week's events concerning the President of the United States. The show was created in 2010 during the second year of the Presidency of Barack Obama. The footage was shot and edited by the video team from the Office of Digital Strategy and narrated by White House Press Secretary Josh Earnest; it was initially shot and edited by former White House videographer Arun Chaudhary, who created the series.

== Background and key people ==
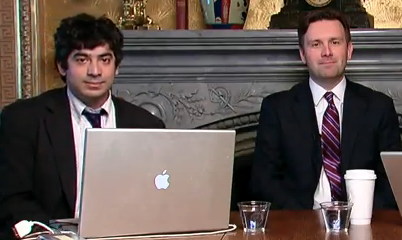
Arun Chaudhary (left) and Josh Earnest (right)

West Wing Week was created in 2010 during the 2nd year of the Presidency of Barack Obama. The weekly shows were first proposed by Arun Chaudhary, who served as the Obama presidential campaign's New Media Road Director; to this end, he created an un-aired pilot of the proposed series for his seniors. The series is narrated by Josh Earnest, Josh Earnest said that Arun Chaudhary "is the creative force behind West Wing Week". Chaudhary was the first official White House videographer in history. The West Wing Week Project was part of President Barack Obama's commitment to transparent government. The two individuals who have held the position of official videographer both worked for the 2008 Obama presidential campaign; additionally the White House has declined to provide any information about the costs, salary or budget lines for the project.

== Production ==
The show is shot with a Sony EX3 and a 1980s-era 416 Sennheiser shotgun microphone, and subsequently edited on Final Cut Pro. Video footage is recorded throughout the week by the White House videographer. The material is then usually edited on a Thursday and released the next day (usually on Friday at 12:00 AM EDT). According to the Presidential Record Act all footage must be archived. It is stored in the presidential records. The episodes titles are decided by Arun Chaudhary. The music used in West Wing Week is performed by the United States Marine Band. At the end of each episode there is usually a "sting", or unscripted twist.

== Critical reception ==
Everything that is posted in West Wing Week is vetted and must be approved for release by The White House Press Office. This has caused some critics to argue that the webcast videos are "nothing more than press releases" some saying it "borders on propaganda".

David Almacy, former White House internet director during President George W Bush's administration, argues that while the idea of West Wing Week is "intriguing", it is an unnecessary expense. Almacy says "It is taxpayer funded and the videographer has the ability to take scenes and edit them the way they wish, and when you have a White House press corps that's a hundred of feet away from the Oval Office," he continues, "The videographer is a federal employee, the power of editing could cause some concerns about perceived propaganda." ... "With average views between 5,000 and 10,000 for most West Wing Weeks (with a few exceptions), one could argue that the costs associated with producing the weekly installments aren't providing much value to citizens, especially in tough economic times when Congress and the White House are looking for ways to cut the budget," adds Mr Almacy.

One unnamed journalist, interviewed by the BBC, said some members of the White House press corps "resent" the access Chaudhary gets, adding that sometimes events appear on West Wing Week that were closed to the press.

== Episodes ==
West Wing Week is a weekly released (usually on Fridays at 12:00 am EDT) web-episode by The White House of the weeks events concerning the President of the United States. Episodes are also available via YouTube, The White House website and through iTunes. There are also special episodes, such as Mailbag and Dispatch episodes. Usually before a dispatch episodes is released the White House will release a preview trailer. Dispatches episodes are devoted to a specific topic, for example, in 2011 there was a special "Dispatches from Sudan". Mailbag episodes are released 2–3 times a year and focus on answering questions sent to the President.

=== 2010 ===
No.	Week	Episode Name	Notes
1	04/2/2010	"Future Planes of the Future" President Obama filling out his 2010 census form.	Friday, March 26: President announces START Treaty; Saturday and Sunday, March 27–28: The President's trip to Afghanistan; Monday, March 29: President Obama fills out his census form, The President's Seder; Tuesday, March 30: Signing of the Healthcare and Education Reconciliation Act, and French President Nicolas Sarkozy visits the White House (video only); Wednesday March 31: The Green Hornet, The First Lady plants her vegetable garden with help from DC elementary school students (video only), The Recovery Act Tax Credit Savings Tool; Thursday, April 1: The President travels to Maine to speak on Health Care Reform
2	04/9/2010	"24 Tiny Marzipan Beaks" President Obama and President Dmitry Medvedev preparing to sign the New START treaty	This episode of West Wing Week was uploaded from location in Prague, Czech Republic, specifically from the American Ambassador's residence. It contains portions of the President's events over the last week, including: a jobs town hall in Charlotte, NC, the White House Easter Egg Roll, the President's first pitch on opening day for the Nationals, Joe Biden on your recovery dollars, the New START treaty, and more.
3	04/16/2010	"The Interpreter's Lounge" President Obama speaking at the Nuclear Security Summit, Washington 2010	This installment takes goes step-by-step with the President as he returns from the Czech Republic, hosts the largest international summit ever held in Washington, D.C., and lays out a new vision for crewed space exploration at the Kennedy Space Center. Also looks the First Lady as she made her first official solo international trip.: Friday, April 9; The President at Prague Castle; President on the Mine Tragedy in West Virginia.; Sunday, April 11: Bilateral Meetings on Nuclear Security at the Blair House.; Monday, April 12: Nuclear Security Summit Day 1.; Tuesday, April 13; Nuclear Security Summit Day 2 – Opening; Nuclear Security Summit Day 2 – Closing; The First Lady and Jill Biden in Haiti.; Wednesday, April 14: Bipartisan Meeting on Wall Street Reform; Thursday, April 15: The President at NASA.
4	04/23/2010	"Competing the Old-Fashioned Way" President Obama and Vice-president Joe Biden discussing Supreme Court nominations	This installment follows the President as he hosts the Great Outdoors Conference, holds a meeting of the President's Economic Recovery Advisory Board, meets with his Special Envoy to the Sudan, discusses Supreme Court nominations with congressional leadership, travels to New York City to talk Wall Street Reform, and celebrates the 40th Anniversary of Earth Day in the White House Rose Garden. There is a clip from a Martin Luther King Jr. Day discussion that President Obama held in the Roosevelt Room. One of those present was Dr. Dorothy Height who died on April 20, 2010, at the age of 98, a figure of the civil rights movement.: Friday, April 16; The President's remarks at the Great Outdoors Conference; The President's Economic Recovery Advisory Board meets on exports and job creation.; Monday, April 19: The Vice President announces the death of leaders of Al Qaeda in Iraq.; Tuesday, April 20: The President's statement on the passing of Dr. Dorothy Height.; Wednesday, April 21; The President's meeting with Congressional Leadership on the Supreme Court; The First Lady with Vancouver Olympians.; Thursday, April 22; The President speaks on Wall Street Reform in New York City; The President and his Administration celebrate Earth Day.
5	04/30/2010	"Doing the Math" President Obama visits the POET Biorefining plant in Macon, Missouri.	This week, follows the President as he attends a naturalization ceremony for some members of the Armed Forces, delivers a eulogy for West Virginia miners, welcomes the World Series Champion New York Yankees, travels to the Midwest as part of his White House to Main Street tour, and more.: Friday, April 23: The Naturalization of 24 American Service Members.; Saturday, April 24: The President's Weekly Address: Good News for the Auto Industry.; Sunday, April 25: The President and Vice President speak at a memorial service for the lives lost in Big Branch Mine.; Monday, April 26; President Obama welcomes the New York Yankees, 2009 World Series Champions; The President hosts an entrepreneurship summit; Tuesday, April 27; The President's Bipartisan Fiscal Commission holds its first meeting; President Obama tours the Siemens Wind Turbine Blade Manufacturing Plan; The President's Visit to MogoOrganic; The President speaks at a town hall meeting in Ottumwa, Iowa.; Wednesday, April 28; President Obama visits the POET Biorefining plant in Macon, Missouri; Dr. Biden reflects on the Wounded Warrior Soldier Ride; Thursday, April 29: Remembering Dorothy Height.
6	05/07/2010	"X.Y.Z."	This week, follows the President as he monitors and then visits areas affected by the BP Oil Rig incident, delivers a commencement address at University of Michigan, attends the White House Correspondents Dinner, presents the Commander-in-Chief trophy to the Navy Midshipman, ushers in Cinco de Mayo much more.
7	05/14/2010	"Hang on to Your Hats"	This week, follows the President as he speaks to the nation about job numbers, monitors the oil leak in the gulf of Mexico, says goodbye to the spring interns, gives the commencement address at Hampton University, swears in his Intelligence Advisory Board, welcomes the President of Afghanistan, congratulates PM David Cameron, visits Buffalo NY and more.: Friday, May 7: The President delivers remarks about latest employment numbers.; Sunday, May 9: The President gives the commencement address at Hampton University.; Monday, May 10; The President announces Solicitor General Elena Kagan as his nominee for Supreme Court Justice; The President meets with Cabinet members to review BP efforts to stop the oil leak.; Wednesday, May 12: The President welcomes Afghan President Karzai to the White House.; Thursday, May 13: The President talks about the economy in Buffalo, NY.
8	05/21/2010	"85 Ton Electric Arc Furnace"	This week, follows the President as he honors the nations top police officers, mourns officers killed in the line of duty, meets with top cabinet members about containing the BP oil leak in the Gulf, signs the Freedom of the Press act, welcomes the NCAA Women's Basketball Champs UConn Huskies, travels to Youngstown, Ohio to visit a steel factory, hosts a State Dinner for the President of Mexico, and informs the American people on what Wall Street reform will mean for them.: Friday, May 14; President Obama congratulates TOP COPS for being true heroes; President Obama delivers remarks about the ongoing response to the Deepwater BP oil spill.; Saturday, May 15: President Obama honors fallen law enforcement officers.; Sunday, May 16: The First Lady gives the commencement address at George Washington University.; Monday, May 17; President Obama signs the Daniel Pearl Freedom of the Press Act; President Obama congratulates the UConn Huskies on their second straight NCAA championship.; Tuesday, May 18: President Obama visits Youngstown, Ohio and talks about creating new jobs.; Wednesday, May 19; President Obama welcomes President Calderone and Mrs. Zavala of Mexico to the White House; President Obama and the First Lady host the State Dinner with Mexico.
9	05/28/2010	"I, State Your Name"	This week, follows the President as he signs a memorandum on fuel efficiency, meets with his economic team and Congressional leaders about Wall Street reform, delivers the commencement address at West Point, hosts the leaders of Lebanon and Liberia, plays basketball with Russian students, holds a reception for Asian Americans and Pacific Islanders, celebrates National Small Business Week, holds discussions with Senate, Republicans, travels to California, checks out some solar panels, talks economics with workers, welcomes NCAA Men's Basketball Champs the Duke Blue Devils and the US World Cup Soccer Team, gives a press conference on the BP oil spill and more.: Friday, May 21: President Obama signs a Presidential Memorandum on Fuel Efficiency.; Saturday, May 22: President Obama delivers the commencement address at the West Point Military Academy.; Monday, May 24; President Obama calls the Governors of Gulf Coast States; President Obama hosts a reception to celebrate Asian American and Pacific Islander Heritage Month.; Tuesday, May 25 :President Obama celebrates small business week.; Wednesday, May 26: President Obama tours Solyndra inc.; Thursday, May 27; President Obama welcomes the Duke Blue Devils; President Obama holds a press conference; President Obama meets with Liberian President Ellen Johnson-Sirleaf.
10	06/04/2010	"More All"	This installment follows the President while he visits the troubled Gulf Coast, celebrates Memorial Day, honors Paul McCartney and the current National Spelling Bee Champ, meets with General Odierno and President Garcia of Peru, and more.: Friday, May 28, 2010: The President's visit to the Gulf Coast.; Monday, May 31, 2010: The President on Memorial Day in Illinois; The President on Memorial Day at Andrews Airforce Base; The Vice President on Memorial Day at Arlington National Cemetery.; Tuesday, June 1, 2010: The President's meeting with the Co-Chairs of the BP Oil Spill Commission; President Obama meets with Peruvian President Alan García.; Wednesday, June 2, 2010: The President meets with Gen. Raymond Odierno, Commanding General, United States Forces—Iraq; The President presents Sir Paul McCartney with the Gershwin Prize for Popular Song.; Thursday, June 3, 2010: The President speaks at the U.S.–India Strategic Dialogue.
12	06/11/2010	" Note to Self"	This follows the President as he speaks about job growth at K. Neal Trucks, makes his third visit to the Gulf Coast, announces his new Director of Intelligence, meets with Cabinet Secretaries about the BP oil spill, delivers the commencement address at Kalamazoo High School, holds a live tele-town hall with seniors about health care and more.: Friday, June 4, 2010; The President and Vice President tour K. Neal International Trucks; The President's 3rd trip to the Gulf Coast.; Saturday, June 5, 2010: The President announces new Director of National Intelligence.; Monday, June 7, 2010; The President's BP Cabinet Meeting; The President's Kalamazoo Commencement Address.; Tuesday, June 8, 2010; The President's Health Care Tele-Town Hall with Seniors; White House Congressional Picnic.; Wednesday, June 9, 2010; The President meets with President Abbas of the Palestinian Authority; The President speaks about the United Nations Security Council sanctions against Iran; Thursday, June 10, 2010: The President meets with Bipartisan Congressional Leaders.
13	06/18/2010	"Gator-cade"	This week President Obama hosts an event for small business owners in the Oval Office, makes his fourth trip to the Gulf Coast, meets with governors, residents and workers to discuss the spill, speaks at the Naval Air Station in Pensacola, gives his first Oval Office address, meets with BP Executives, speaks at the American Nurses Association and more.: Friday, June 11, 2010: President remarks on Small Business initiatives.; Monday, June 14, 2010; The President's Fourth Trip to the Gulf: Day 1; President Obama details federal response to spill for Gulf residents.; Tuesday, June 15, 2010; The President walks with Governor Crist on a Florida beach; The President speaks at Pensacola Naval Air Station; The President gives an Oval Office address on BP oil Spill and Energy.; Wednesday, June 16, 2010; The President meets with BP Executives and Gives Statement; The President speaks to the American Nurses Association.; Thursday, June 17, 2010: The President meets with Navy Secretary and former Mississippi Governor, Ray Mabus.
14	06/25/2010	"Mailbag Day"	Mailbag Day: make episode thirteen of West Wing Week took a chance to respond to some of letters and e-mails received by the President. This week includes the topic of whether the White House composts, which direction the eagle on the Presidential seal faces, and examines the process by which the flag flying over the White House is lowered to half-staff.
15	07/02/2010	"Home of the Kringle"	This week, follows President Obama as he gets a lesson in mathematics in the Oval Office, attends the G8 and G-20 summits in Canada, meets with the Chairman of the Federal Reserve, hosts King Abdullah in the White House and more.: Friday, June 25, 2010; The President's Wall Street Reform Statement; The President at the G8.; Saturday, June 26, 2010: The President wraps up G8 Summit and kicks off G-20 in Toronto.; Sunday, June 27, 2010: The President speaks at the G-20 Summit.; Monday, June 28, 2010; The President on loss of Senator Robert Byrd: "A voice of principle and reason"; 2010 MATHCOUNT Winners Visit the President.; Tuesday, June 29, 2010; President meets with Chairman of the Federal Reserve Board Ben Bernake; The President meets with bipartisan Senators to discuss climate and energy legislation; President Obama meets with King Abdullah of Saudi Arabia in the White House; Wednesday, June 30, 2010: The President discusses the economy on America's Main Streets in Racine, Wisconsin.; Thursday, July 1, 2010: The President addresses the nation on Comprehensive Immigration Reform.
16	07/09/2010	"Independence"	This week, saw the President as he speaks about 6 straight months of job growth, celebrates America's Independence Day with Military Families, watches a fireworks extravaganza with the First Lady, meets with Israeli Prime Minister Netanyahu, tours Smith Electric Vehicles in Kansas City and more.: Friday, July 2, 2010; The President speaks about June employment numbers; The President attends a memorial service for Senator Robert Byrd in Charleston, WV.; Sunday, July 4, 2010; The President delivers remarks at Independence Day Celebration.; The President celebrates America's Independence Day on the South Lawn of the White House; The President and Military Families watch fireworks at the White House.; Tuesday, July 6, 2010: The President meets with Israeli Prime Minister Netanyahu.; Wednesday, July 7, 2010: The President announces export council.; Thursday, July 8, 2010: The President visits Smith Electric Vehicles and speaks with workers.
17	7/16/2010	"6 Principals"	This week, follows the President as he speaks about the economy in Las Vegas, celebrates 100 years of the Boy Scouts of America, meets with President Fernandez of the Dominican Republic, visits with the 2010 Principal of the Year award winners, announces the new Director of the Office of Management and Budget and more.: Friday, July 9, 2010: The President speaks about the state of the nation's economy; Monday, July 12, 2010: The President meets with President Fernandez of the Dominican Republic; Tuesday, July 13, 2010: The President announces Jack Lew as the new director of OMB; Wednesday, July 14, 2010: The President meets with President Bill Clinton and business leaders in the Roosevelt Room; Thursday, July 15, 2010: The President speaks about clean energy
18	7/23/2010	"A Sensible Mid Westerner"	This week, follows the President as he speaks up for unemployed Americans, congratulates this year's WNBA champs, talks with astronaut John Glenn about space exploration, meets with British Prime Minister Cameron, signs the historic Wall Street Reform bill into law and more.: Friday, July 16, 2010: The President gives an update on the BP Oil Spill in the Gulf.; Monday, July 19, 2010: The President speaks up for unemployed Americans; The President congratulates WNBA Champs.; Tuesday, July 20, 2010: The President meets with British Prime Minister Cameron.; Wednesday, July 21, 2010: The President signs Wall Street Reform and Consumer Protection Act.; Thursday, July 22, 2010: The President signs the Improper Payments Elimination Act.
19	7/30/2010	"The Men in Blue Jumpsuits"	This week, follows the President as he fights for campaign finance reform, boosts small business, meets with Space Shuttle Atlantis astronauts, commemorates the 20th anniversary of the Americans with Disabilities Act, welcomes the 2009 Softball World Series champions, makes an appearance on The View and more.: Monday, July 26, 2010; The President speaks about limiting special interests and the DISCLOSE Act; The President thanks Space Shuttle Atlantic astronauts; The President commemorates the 20th anniversary of the Americans with Disabilities Act.; Tuesday, July 27, 2010: The President meets with bipartisan leadership in Congress.; Wednesday, July 28, 2010: The President speaks about small businesses and apple pie in Edison, New Jersey.; Thursday, July 29, 2010: The President speaks about education.
20	8/06/2010	"Dispatches from the Gulf"	A special Gulf Coast episode of West Wing Week. This week the episode travels through communities on America's Gulf Coast to give the viewer a special behind the scenes look at the federal government's historic and unprecedented effort to contain and clean up after the Deepwater BP oil spill. Responders can be seen as they skim sheen off the ocean and respond to oiled wildlife. A town hall with Navy Secretary Ray Mabus, as he hears the concerns of locals. Engineers are in the episode as they pump mud into the well itself, creating a more permanent seal and more.
21	Special	West Wing Week: Mailbag Day Summer Edition	Mailbag Day! This West Wing Week the administration responds to the letters and e-mails sent in. It answers whether the President gets stamps in his passport, learn about pre-existing conditions and the Affordable Care Act from Secretary of Health and Human Services Kathleen Sebelius, and see who gets to keep the President's bill signing pens.
22	8/20/2010	"Turkey Turkey and a Jammer"	This week, the First Family to Panama City Beach, Florida for a weekend of swimming, mini-golf, and meeting with local business owners. Next up, the President hits the road travelling to Milwaukee, Seattle and Columbus to talk to business owners and families about the economy.: Saturday, August 15, 2010; The First Family Visits Gulf Coast; Photo: A Swim In Panama City Beach.; Monday, August 16, 2010: New Battery Technology and New Jobs in Wisconsin.; Tuesday, August 17, 2010: "Small Businesses Are the Backbone of Our Economy and the Cornerstones of Our Communities".; Wednesday, August 18, 2010; Around the Kitchen Table in Columbus, Ohio; Video: A Backyard Conversation with the President.
23	Special	"Dispatches from Iraq" – Preview	This week episode has preview of next Friday's episode "Dispatches from Iraq" where the West Wing Week join, both troops and civilians, on the ground as combat operations end in Iraq. It will go behind the scenes with Provisional Reconstruction Teams, train with the Iraqi Federal Police, learn how millions of tons of equipment gets redeployed or sent home and much more.: Wednesday, August 25, 2010: The Middle Class Task Force meets on small business and the middle class.; Tuesday, August 24, 2010: Vice President Biden speaks on the Recovery Act spurring innovation.; Monday, August 23, 2010: Vice President Biden speaks to the Veterans of Foreign Wars as combat operations in Iraq draw to a close.
24	Special	"Dispatches from Iraq"	This week the President announced the end of America's combat mission in Iraq and West Wing Week takes you there, on the ground, with an in-depth, behind-the-scenes look at the change of mission. West Wing Week spent a week on the ground with our troops and civilians, some coming home, some staying for the next mission, training and supporting the Iraqis now that they have the lead in protecting their own country.: Wednesday, August 31, 2010: The President addresses the nation on the end of the combat mission in Iraq from the Oval Office.; Tuesday, August 31, 2010: The President talks with the troops at Fort Bliss, Texas.
25	9/10/2010	"The Year 5771"	This week, follows the President as he celebrates Labor Day in Milwaukee, welcomes the Secretary-General of NATO, outlines plans to grow the economy in Cleveland and more.: Monday, September 6, 2010: President Obama stands with American workers on Labor Day.; Tuesday, September 7, 2010 : Readout of President's Meeting with NATO Secretary General Rasmussen.; Wednesday, September 8, 2010 : The President speaks on his vision for the economy in Ohio.
26	9/17/2010	"Back to School"	This week, follows the President as he travels to Arlington, Virginia to attend a wreath laying ceremony at the Pentagon 9/11 Memorial, celebrates the start of a new school year with his second annual 'Back to School' speech in Philadelphia, and holds a Cabinet meeting looking for ways for the Federal Government's agencies to work together to improve the economy.: Saturday, September 11, 2010: The President, the Vice President, the First Lady and Dr. Biden: A Day of Service and Remembrance.; Tuesday, September 14, 2010: The President's Back to School Speech: "We Not Only Reach For Our Own Dreams, We Help Others Do the Same".; Wednesday, September 15, 2010: President Obama on Small Business Jobs & Tax Cuts: "We Don't Have Time for Any More Games".; Thursday, September 15, 2010; President Obama Speaks to the President's Export Council; President Obama Announces Expanded Efforts to Promote Science, Tech, Engineering and Math Education with "Change the Equation."
27	9/24/2010	"Immeasurable Courage and Uncommon Valor"	This week, the President as he announces that Elizabeth Warren will lead the effort to get the Consumer Financial Protection Bureau off the ground, participates in a live CNBC town hall, awards Chief Master Sergeant Richard L. Etchberger, U.S. Air Force, the Medal of Honor posthumously for the valor he displayed in combat, travels to New York for the United Nations General Assembly and more.: Friday, September 17, 2010: The President Appoints Elizabeth Warren to Lead a "Watchdog for the American Consumer".; Monday, September 20, 2010: President Obama's Town Hall on the Economy, Business and the Middle Class.; Tuesday, September 21, 2010: The President Awards Chief Etchberger the Medal of Honor.; Wednesday, September 22, 2010: A Backyard Discussion on the Patient's Bill of Rights.; Thursday, September 23, 2010:: The President to the UN General Assembly: "We Can Say That This Time Will Be Different".
28	10/1/2010	"One Two Three ... Lancers!"	This week follows the President as he signs the Small Business Jobs Act, speaks to college journalists, holds backyard discussions about the economy with area families across the heartland and more.: Monday, September 27, 2010: President Obama Signs Small Business Jobs Act – Learn What's In It.; Monday, September 27, 2010: President Obama to College Journalists: "What I Want to Do is Just to Go Speak to Young People Directly".; Tuesday, September 28, 2010: The President on Our Veterans & Choosing Priorities in Albuquerque.; Wednesday, September 29, 2010: A Backyard Discussion on the Patient's Bill of Rights.; Wednesday, September 29, 2010: A Backyard Stroll Through Health Reform in Des Moines.; Wednesday, September 29, 2010: Discussing the Economy at the Southampton Recreation Association in Richmond
29	Special	"A Farewell to Rahm"	This week the President bids farewell to his outgoing Chief of Staff, Rahm Emanuel, and appoints Pete Rouse the new Interim Chief of Staff, holds the first ever Community College Summit at the White House alongside Dr. Biden, signs the bill granting the Congressional Gold Medal to Japanese-American World War II vets – the Army's 100th Infantry Battalion and 442nd Regimental Combat Team, awards the Medal of Honor to Staff Sergeant Robert J. Miller, and more.: October 1, 2010: Goodbye, Rahm; October 4, 2010: Building Skills for America's Future; October 5, 2010: An Awe Inspiring Chapter in America's History
30	10/15/2010	"I Spy"	Follows the President as he comes out for investing in infrastructure to boost the economy and create jobs, and meets with students from all levels of education throughout the week. From elementary and middle school students from the documentary ‘Waiting for Superman,' to high school and college students who are finalists of the NFTE National Youth Entrepreneurship Challenge, to college students who have benefited from the American Opportunity Tax Credit.: October 11, 2010: The President on Infrastructure Investment: "This is Work That Needs to Be Done. There Are Workers Who Are Ready to Do It."; October 12, 2010; Behind-The-Scenes Video: President Obama Meets With "Waiting for Superman" Students.; That's NFTE: Award-Winning Teen Entrepreneurs Visit Oval Office; October 13, 2010: What the American Opportunity Tax Credit Means for College Students.
31	10/22/2010	"The White House Science Fair"	This week follows the President as he hosts former Secretary of State Condoleezza Rice at the White House, holds the first ever White House Science Fair, signs an Executive Order renewing the Initiative on Educational Excellence for Hispanics, then heads out West to speak in Oregon, Washington State, California, Nevada, and Minnesota, and more.: October 18, 2010: Robots, Solar Cars and Rockets at the White House Science Fair.; October 19, 2010; President Obama Signs Executive Order On Education and Hispanics; White House White Board: CEA Chair Austan Goolsbee Explains the Jobs Trends.; October 21, 2010: Remarks by the President in a Discussion on Women and the Economy in Seattle, Washington.
32	10/29/2010	"The Mysterious Case of Mysterious Case 55"	Follows the President as he visits American Cord and Webbing, a thriving small business in Woodsocket, Rhode Island, calls into radio shows across the country, joins the Vice President in the East Room to mark Domestic Violence Awareness Month, goes on The Daily Show, congratulates American rescue workers who used their expertise to help free 33 Chilean Miners, and more.: October 25, 2010: President Obama in Rhode Island: "When You Vote Against Small Business Tax Relief..."; October 27, 2010; President Obama on The Daily Show with Jon Stewart.; An Event to End Violence Against Women.
33	11/05/2010	"Don't Watch the Plasma Arc"	Follows the President as he tours Stromberg Sheet Metal, a Maryland company planning to expand its workforce in the coming year, explains the actions taken to disrupt and investigate a potential terrorist attack, welcomes trick-or-treaters to the White House for Halloween, takes questions from the press and speaks about ways to move the country forward and grow our economy, surprises a group of wounded warriors during their White House tour and more.: October 29, 2010; The President in Maryland: "We have to do more to accelerate this economy"; Press Secretary Gibbs on Potential Suspicious Packages.; October 31, 2010: Trick-or-Treat with the President and the First Lady.; November 3, 2010: President Obama's Press Conference: "Let's find those areas where we can agree".
34	11/12/2010	"OCONUS"	On a special edition for the trip to Asia this week, with the President as he meets with students, citizens, business leaders, and government officials in India, travels to Indonesia to extend a hand of friendship to the Indonesian people, attends the G-20 in Seoul, South Korea, and more.: November 7, 2010: Remarks by the President and the First Lady in Town Hall with Students in Mumbai, India.; November 10, 2010: President Obama in Jakarta: "Indonesia's Example To the World"; November 11, 2010: President Obama to America's Veterans: "We Remember."
35	11/19/2010	"I Really Like this Guy"	This week follows the President as he attends the G-20 in Seoul, Korea and the annual APEC meeting in Yokohama, Japan, awards the Medal of Honor to Staff Sergeant Salvatore Giunta, and the National Medals of Science and Technology, affirms the Administration's commitment to promoting equality in the work place at a meeting of women leaders in the Roosevelt Room, and more.: November 16, 2010: President Obama Presents the Medal of Honor to Staff Sergeant Salvatore Giunta: "We're All in Your Debt"; November 17, 2010: The Importance of Equal Pay For Women.; November 18, 2010; The New START Treaty: "A National Security Imperative"; President Obama on GM: "One of the Toughest Tales" Becoming a "Success Story".
36	11/26/2010	"The Turkey Behind the Turkey"	This week follows the President as he attends the NATO Summit in Portugal, visits Kokomo, Indiana, participates in the traditional turkey pardoning and volunteers alongside the First Family at Martha's Table, a local organization that provides nutrition and other family services to those in need, and more.: November 20, 2010: President Obama at NATO: "And Today We Stand United in Afghanistan".; November 23, 2010: The President & Vice President in Kokomo, Indiana: "Don't Bet Against the American Worker".; November 24, 2010; Pardoning the National Thanksgiving Turkey; Raw Video: The Obama Family Volunteers at Martha's Table.; November 25, 2010: The President's Thanksgiving Weekly Address
37	12/03/2010	"Sharp Elbows"	This week follows the President as he holds a meeting with bipartisan members of the Congressional Leadership at the White House, greets the American 2010 Nobel Laureates in the Oval Office, meets with General Colin Powell, makes a joint statement about the importance of ratifying the START treaty with Russia, and more. Also, the First Lady, accompanied by Sasha and Malia, are presented with the official Christmas Tree.: November 29, 2010: President Obama on the Federal Pay Freeze: "Getting This Deficit Under Control is Going to Require Broad Sacrifice".; November 30, 2010; The President on His Bipartisan Meeting: "The Beginning of a New Dialogue"; President Obama on the DOD Report on Don't Ask, Don't Tell.; December 1, 2010; Behind-the-Scenes Video: The White House Christmas 2010: Simple Gifts; President Obama & General Powell Push for a New START.
38	12/10/2010	"It's Alive!"	This week follows the President as he visits Afghanistan to celebrate the holidays with our men and women in uniform, announces a free trade agreement with South Korea, attends a series of meetings at the White House and holds a press conference to answer questions about the tax cut compromise, signs the Claims Resolution Act of 2010, and more.: December 3, 2010: A Surprise Visit to the Troops in Afghanistan.; December 6, 2010: President Obama in North Carolina: "Our Generation's Sputnik Moment is Now".; December 7, 2010: President Obama on Tax Cuts and Unemployment Extension: "The Right Thing to Do".; December 8, 2010; President Obama on the Middle Class Tax Cuts and Unemployment Insurance Agreement: "A Good Deal For The American People"; President Obama Holds a Cabinet Meeting – In Photos; President Obama Signs the Claims Resolution Act of 2010.
39	12/17/2010	"All These Pens"	Follows the President as he signs a landmark childhood nutrition bill, urges passage of the compromise on tax cuts and unemployment insurance, discusses the Afghanistan-Pakistan Annual Review, and more.: December 13, 2010: The President & First Lady on Child Nutrition Bill: "The Basic Nutrition They Need to Learn and Grow and to Pursue Their Dreams".; December 15, 2010: President Obama Meets with CEOs on the "Path That Will Lead to Economic Success".; December 16, 2010: President Obama on the Afghanistan-Pakistan Annual Review: "A Very Difficult Endeavor" but "Significant Progress".
40	12/24/2010	"AKA Santa Claus"	Follows the President as he signs the repeal of "Don't Ask Don't Tell", looks back at an historic lame duck session, reads to kids for the Holiday season, and receives the Census report.: December 17, 2010; The President Signs the Tax Cut & Unemployment Insurance Compromise: "Some Good News for the American People this Holiday Season"; President Obama Reads to Schoolchildren.; December 20, 2010: President Obama Signs Critical Legislation to Prevent Child Abuse and Domestic Violence.; December 22, 2010: The President Signs Repeal of "Don't Ask Don't Tell": "Out of Many, We Are One".
41	Special	"Mailbag Day, New Year's Edition"	In this special edition of West Wing Week, look back over the last year, watch the President sign a law getting those loud TV ads under control, and find out the answers to a couple burning questions from the mailbag.

=== 2011 ===
No.	Week	Episode Name	Notes
42	1/07/2011	"Resolutions"	This week, the first family returns to Washington, the President signs over 30 bills into law, and West Wing staff share their New Year's resolutions.
43	Special	Dispatches from Sudan – Preview	This week, an historic referendum took place in Sudan and West Wing Week takes you there. Watch a preview of "Dispatches from Sudan" and join General Scott Gration, President Obama's Special Envoy to Sudan for a unique look at the vote that could result in the world's newest nation. Go behind the scenes at polling stations from Juba to Khartoum, meet some of the international community helping ensure the vote is fair and peaceful, travel to Darfur to inspect conditions on the ground, and learn about the commitment of the United States to peace in this region after decades of civil war.: January 10, 2011: Remarks by President Obama and President Sarkozy of France after Bilateral Meeting.; January 9, 2011: Statement by the President on Sudan.; January 6, 2011: "Expectations and Implications: A Discussion on the Southern Sudan Referendum".; December 22, 2010: Readout of the President's Call with First Vice President of Sudan Salva Kiir.; September 24, 2010: President Obama in Ministerial Meeting on Sudan: "The Fate of Millions".
44	1/21/2011	"A Rather Large Painting"	This week the President welcomes the presidents of China and Pakistan, serves the D.C. community in observance of Martin Luther King Jr. Day, speaks in remembrance of Ambassador Richard Holbrooke and President John F. Kennedy, and more.: January 14, 2011: President Barack Obama Meets with President Asif Ali Zardari of Pakistan; Honoring Holbrooke: "Because We Could Make A Difference...".; January 17, 2011: "An Example of What Martin Luther King's Birthday Should Be All About".; January 19, 2011: President Obama Welcomes President Hu of China to the White House; Remarks by President Obama and President Hu of the People's Republic of China in an Exchange of Toasts at State Dinner.
45	1/28/2011	"To Build Stuff and Invent Stuff"	This week, the President delivered his State of the Union Address, focused on jobs and the economy, and he took those ideas on the road traveling to Upstate New York and Wisconsin.: January 21, 2011: President Obama in Schenectady: "America is Still Home to the Most Creative and Most Innovative Businesses in the World".; January 24, 2011: Strengthening Our Commitment to Military Families.; January 25, 2011: The State of the Union Address: Winning the Future.; January 26, 2011: The President travels to Wisconsin to talk about his plan to win the future.; January 27, 2011: President Obama answers questions submitted by and voted on by YouTube users in an interview.
46	Special	"Dispatches from Sudan"	This week the official preliminary results from the historic referendum in Sudan were released. The people of Southern Sudan appear to have voted overwhelmingly in support of independence: total turnout was about 97 percent with almost 99 percent of voters casting their ballots to create the world's newest nation. West Wing Week was on the ground in Sudan during the week-long referendum, traveling to all parts of the country with the President's Special Envoy, General Scott Gration. We went behind the scenes at polling stations from Juba to Khartoum, met some of the international community who helped to ensure the vote was fair and peaceful, and traveled to Darfur to inspect conditions and learn about the commitment of the United States to peace in this region after decades of civil war.: October 19, 2009: A Comprehensive Strategy for Sudan.; November 12, 2009: A Public Dialogue on Darfur.; September 24, 2010: President Obama in Ministerial Meeting on Sudan: "The Fate of Millions".; January 6, 2011: "Expectations and Implications: A Discussion on the Southern Sudan Referendum".
47	2/4/2011	"Enter the Hub"	This week, President Obama focused on the innovation part of his plan for winning the future by out-innovating, out-educating, and out-building the rest of the world, with events at Penn State and around Washington, D.C.: Friday, January 28, 2011: Voices of Health Reform: The President Addresses Families USA.; Monday, January 31, 2011; White House to Launch "Startup America" Initiative; Working Closer with Women Online.; Tuesday, February 1, 2011: Readout of the President's Meeting with Technology CEO Council; Readout of the President's Cabinet Meeting; Preparing for Winter Weather; President Obama on the Situation in Egypt: "All Governments Must Maintain Power through Consent, Not Coercion".; Wednesday, February 2, 2011: The New START Treaty: Signed.; Thursday, February 3, 2011: Winning the Future Through Innovation and "Better Buildings".
48	2/11/2011	"The New Electrification"	This week, President Obama focused on the second part of his State of the Union goals of out-innovating, out-building, and out-competing the rest of the world, putting forward plans to build up the nation's infrastructure, investing in things like high speed rail, and expanding broadband access so all of America's families will be equipped to win the future. The Prime Minister of Canada also dropped by.: Friday, February 4, 2011: Press Conference with President Obama and Prime Minister Harper.; Monday, February 7, 2011: President Obama to Business: "Now is the Time to Invest in America".; Tuesday, February 8, 2011: Bringing High-Speed Rail to America.; Thursday, February 10, 2011: The President on the National Wireless Initiative: "We're Going to Have to Up Our Game, Marquette".
49	2/18/2011	"Goodbye, Gibbs"	This week, President Obama released his federal budget, and emphasized the need to make tough choices, taking responsibility for our deficits while investing in education, to prepare our children to be competitive in the global economy and win the future. He also responded to the Egypt Crisis, met some Boy Scouts, and honored some great Americans.
50	2/25/11	"Don't Bump My Atoms"	This week, President Obama held events in Oregon and Ohio focused on winning the future through investments in innovation and small business, and convened his Council on Jobs and Competitiveness at the White House.: Friday, February 18, 2011: Out-Educating the Competition.; Tuesday, February 22, 2011; President Obama Drops By Online Forum on Small Business.; Winning the Future Forum on Small Business: Closing Session.; Wednesday, February 23, 2011: President Obama Speaks on the Turmoil in Libya: "This Violence Must Stop".; Thursday, February 24, 2011: The President & His Council on Jobs and Competitiveness: "My Main Purpose Here Today at This First Meeting I Think is To Listen".
51	3/04/2011	"Green Eggs and Governors"	This week President Obama welcoming the nation's governors, UN Secretary General Ban Ki-Moon, and Mexican President Felipe Calderón to the White House. The First Lady and Education Secretary Arne Duncan also helped kick off Education Month at the Library of Congress.: Monday, February 28, 2011: President Obama to America's Governors: "The Flexibility That You Need to Find Your Own Innovative Ways Forward"; First Lady Michelle Obama & Dr. Jill Biden to America's Governors: Support Our Military Families; President Obama's Meeting With UN Secretary General Ban Ki-Moon.; Wednesday, March 2, 2011: Behind-the-Scenes: First Lady Michelle Obama and Secretary Arne Duncan Read Green Eggs and Ham on Dr. Seuss' Birthday; President Obama on the Tragic Events in Germany; Thursday, March 3, 2011: The President on Libya: "The Violence Must Stop; Muammar Gaddafi Has Lost the Legitimacy to Lead and He Must Leave".
52	3/11/2011	"Law School in 15 Seconds"	This week, President Obama focused on education, visiting some innovative classrooms in Miami and Boston, and dropping in on a US History class in Arlington, Virginia with Australian Prime Minister Julia Gillard.: Friday, March 4, 2011: "I'm Not Willing to Give Up on Any Child In America:" The President's Trip to Miami Central High School.; Monday, March 7, 2011: President Obama to Those Conducting Violence in Libya: "It is Their Choice... and They Will Be Held Accountable"; Show and Tell With President Obama and Prime Minister Gillard.; Tuesday, March 8, 2011: President Obama Talks Education in Boston: "A Moral and Economic Imperative to Give Every Child the Chance to Succeed"; Wednesday, March 9, 2011: President Obama Names Commerce Secretary Gary Locke as Next Ambassador to China; Thursday, March 10, 2011: President Obama & the First Lady at the White House Conference on Bullying Prevention.
53	3/18/2011	"Punching Above Your Weight"	This week, Education Month continued, with President Obama asking Congress to fix No Child Left Behind before the beginning of the coming school year. The President also updates the American people on relief efforts in Japan and pledges continued support. The Prime Minister of Denmark, Taoiseach of Ireland, and the Chicago Blackhawks also stopped by.: Friday, March 11, 2011; Presidential Press Conference on Energy Prices and Supplies; President Obama Welcomes the Chicago Blackhawks; Let's Move! Clinic with the NHL.; Monday, March 14, 2011; President Obama: "It's Not Enough to Leave No Child Behind. We Need to Help Every Child Get Ahead."; President Obama Meets with Danish Prime Minister Rasmussen.; Tuesday, March 15, 2011: President Obama's 2011 NCAA Brackets.; Wednesday, March 16, 2011:Sunshine Week 2011 and Our Ongoing Commitment to Open Government.; Thursday, March 17, 2011; President Obama: "It is My Great Pleasure on St. Patrick's Day to Welcome the New Taoiseach"; President Obama: "We Will Stand with the People of Japan."
54	3/25/2011	"OCONUS II – Mamalluca"	his week, President Obama remained focused on Libya, receiving secure communications from his national security team as the first family visited Latin America. The President made stops in Brazil, Chile, and El Salvador to promote American exports and economic cooperation among the neighbors in our hemisphere.: Friday, March 18, 2011; The President on Libya: "Our Goal is Focused, Our Cause is Just, and Our Coalition is Strong"; Weekly Address: American Jobs Through Exports to Latin America.; Monday, March 21, 2011; "Together We Can Advance Our Common Prosperity": The President Speaks to the People of Brazil; President Obama Answers Questions on Libya: "A Testament to the Men and Women in Uniform".; Tuesday, March 22, 2011; President Obama's Santiago Speech: "The Latin America That I See Today"; The President on Libya: "We Have Already Saved Lives".
55	Week omitted	"Under the Big Blue Whale"	This week, President Obama focused on the situation in Libya, monitoring conditions on the ground and keeping Congress and the American people informed as the mission transitions from U.S. to NATO command. Education month also continued, with the President making stops at a multicultural high school in Washington, D.C., and dropping in on a science fair in New York City.: Monday, March 28, 2011; Presidential "Latinos and Education" Town Hall—A Key to Winning the Future; President Obama's Speech on Libya.; Tuesday, March 29, 2011; Honoring Ronald H. Brown; Late Entry in New York City Science Fair.; Wednesday, March 30, 2011; Remarks by the President on America's Energy Security; The Obama Administration's Blueprint for a Secure Energy Future.
56	4/8/2011	"Windmills? Call Them Wind Turbines!"	This week, President Obama focused on the situation in Libya, monitoring conditions on the ground and keeping Congress and the American people informed as the mission transitions from U.S. to NATO command. Education month also continued, with the President making stops at a multicultural high school in Washington, D.C., and dropping in on a science fair in New York City.: Friday, April 1, 2011: President Obama's Green Fleet Initiative A Bold Step Forward In US Energy Use.; Tuesday, April 5, 2011; President Obama on Budget Negotiations: "We Have Now Matched the Number the Speaker Originally Sought"; White House Press Briefing: President Obama on Budget Negotiations.; Wednesday, April 6, 2011: Reducing Oil Imports and Competing for the Jobs of the Future.
57	4/15/11	"Open for Business"	This week, with the threat of a government shutdown averted, President Obama focused on fiscal responsibility and balancing the need to cut spending and the deficit while continuing to support education, clean energy, and other investments needed to win the future. The Amir of Qatar also visited the White House.: Friday, April 8, 2011; President Obama's Statement on the Budget Agreement; Details of the Bipartisan Budget Deal.; Monday, April 11, 2011; Surprise! It's the President; President Obama Surprises Colorado Middle Schoolers; Tuesday, April 12, 2011: Welcome to JoiningForces.gov.; Wednesday, April 13, 2011; The Country We Believe In: Improving America's Fiscal Future; A Meeting with Bipartisan Leadership on Fiscal Policy; Open for Questions: America's Fiscal Future; President Obama's Framework for $4 Trillion in Deficit Reduction.; Thursday, April 14, 2011: President Obama's Visit from Emir Hamad bin Khalifa al-Thani of Qatar
58	4/22/2011	"My Old Number, 23"	This week, President Obama held townhalls in Northern Virginia, California, and Nevada, to speak directly to the American people about his vision for reducing our debt and bringing down our deficit based on the values of shared responsibility and shared prosperity.: Monday, April 18, 2011; President Obama Presents Air Force Academy with Commander-in-Chief Trophy: "A Group That Has a Lot to Be Proud Of"; The President at Easter Breakfast: "Our Thoughts and Prayers are With All the Families" in North Carolina.; Tuesday, April 19, 2011; President Obama in Virginia on Our Fiscal Future: "We Are Going to Have to Ask Everybody to Sacrifice"; Working Together to Create a 21st Century Immigration System.; Wednesday, April 20, 2011: The President's Facebook Town Hall: Budgets, Values, Engagement.; Thursday, April 21, 2011: President Obama Announces Team to "Root Out Any Cases of Fraud or Manipulation in the Oil Markets".
59	4/29/2011	"Final Adjustments"	This week, while the White House celebrated Easter, holding the traditional egg roll on the South Lawn, President Obama kept his focus on the nation's finances, working on short term and long term ways to get away from high gas prices. He also pledged support for Alabama and other states in the South hit by devastating storms and announced new key members of his National Security team.: Monday, April 25, 2011:Photos & Videos: The 2011 White House Easter Egg Roll; Tuesday, April 26, 2011: President Obama to Congress: "I Hope We Can All Agree That, Instead of Continuing to Subsidize Yesterday's Energy Sources, We Need to Invest in Tomorrow's"; Readout of the President's Meeting with Crown Prince Mohammed bin Zayed Al Nahyan of the United Arab Emirates; Wednesday, April 27, 2011: The President on Devastation in Alabama; Thursday, April 28, 2011: President Obama Announces New Members of his National Security Team
60	5/6/2011	"A Good Day For America"	This week, the President announced the death of Osama bin Laden, visited New York City to honor the victims of 9/11 and their families, made sure the federal government was doing its part in the states devastated by storms and more.: Friday, April 29, 2011; The President in Alabama: "We're Going to Make Sure that You're Not Forgotten"; First Family Tours Kennedy Space Center; President Obama Delivers Commencement Address at Miami Dade College; Saturday, April 30, 2011 :President Obama at White House Correspondents Dinner.; Sunday, May 1, 2011: Osama Bin Laden Dead.; Monday, May 2, 2011; President Obama Presents Medal of Honor: "We're Reminded That We Are Fortunate to Have Americans Who Dedicate Their Lives to Protecting Ours"; "Together As An American Family": A Bipartisan Congressional Dinner at the White House.; Tuesday, May 3, 2011: President Obama Welcomes Outstanding Teachers to the White House.; Wednesday, May 4, 2011: "Our Obligations to Each Other As Americans": President Obama Welcomes the Wounded Warrior Project's Soldier Ride.; Thursday, May 5, 2011: The President in NYC: "When We Say We Will Never Forget, We Mean What We Say".
61	5/13/2011	"On the Border"	This week the President talks clean energy and gas prices in Indiana, focuses on fixing our broken immigration system in Texas, and honors Top Cops here in the Rose Garden.: Friday, May 6, 2011: The President on Jobs & Gas Prices: Read His Remarks, Download the Graphic; The President & Vice President at Fort Campbell: "Gratitude"; Tuesday, May 10, 2011: President Obama on Fixing Our Broken Immigration System: "E Pluribus, Unum"; Wednesday, May 11, 2011: President Obama & Poets at the White House; Thursday, May 12, 2011: The President on TOP COPS: "It Wasn't Talk; It Was What They Did"
62	5/19/2011	"The Commencement at Booker T"	This week the President visited flood survivors in Memphis, TN before speaking at the Booker T. Washington High School graduation, celebrated the Situation Room's 50th birthday, and gave a speech on the change sweeping across the Middle East and North Africa.: Friday, May 13, 2011: Statement by the Press Secretary on 50th Anniversary of the White House Situation Room.; Monday, May 16, 2011: Behind the Scenes: President Obama Surprises the Class of 2011 at Booker T. Washington High School.; President Obama at Booker T. Washington High: Commencement Challenge Winners; Tuesday, May 17, 2011: President Obama and King Abdullah II of Jordan Discuss Libya, Israel, Palestine, and Change in the Middle East.; Wednesday, May 18, 2011: The President at Coast Guard Academy Commencement: "I've Seen Your Devotion to Duty"; Thursday, May 19, 2011: Moment of Opportunity: President Obama on the Middle East & North Africa
63	Week omitted	"OCONUS III: A Homecoming of Sorts"	This week, President Obama embarked on a six-day trip to Europe, visiting Ireland, the United Kingdom, France and Poland to engage our allies in the region on a host of issues. While overseas, the President pledged support for those back home affected by devastating tornadoes in Missouri and across the Midwest. Before leaving, the President met with Israeli Prime Minister Netanyahu and went to the CIA Headquarters in Langley, VA. That's May 20 to the 26, or "OCONUS (Outside the Continental United States) III: A Homecoming of Sorts.": Friday, May 20, 2011; President Obama Speaks to Our Intelligence Community: "I Put My Bet on You"; President Obama Hosts Prime Minister Netanyahu: "An Extremely Constructive Discussion"; Monday, May 23, 2011; Deepest Condolences for Missouri and the Midwest; President Obama in Dublin: "Never Has a Nation So Small Inspired So Much in Another"; Tuesday, May 24, 2011: President Obama on Devastation Throughout the Midwest: "We Are Here For You"; Wednesday, May 25, 2011: President Obama Speaks to the Parliament in London: "The Time for Our Leadership is Now"; Thursday, May 26, 2011: President Obama and President Medvedev Meet Before G8 Summit
64	06/02/2011	"One Step at a Time"	This week, President Obama traveled to Joplin, Missouri in the wake of historic and deadly tornadoes to see the devastation first hand. The President finished his week-long trip to Europe in Poland and visited Arlington National Cemetery on Memorial Day.: Friday, May 27, 2011; Wrapping Up the G8 Summit and Heading to Poland; Photos: President Obama in Poland; Sunday, May 29, 2011: President Obama in Joplin: "It's an Example of What the American Spirit is all About"; Monday, May 30, 2011: President Obama at Arlington National Cemetery: "Honor the Sacrifice of Those We've Lost"; Tuesday, May 31, 2011; President Barack Obama Fills Out His New National Security Team; President Obama Nominates John Bryson to be Our Nation's Next Commerce Secretary; Wednesday, June 1, 2011: June 1: Official Start of the Hurricane Season
65	06/10/2011	"Way to Get Our Money Back"	This week, President Obama traveled to a Chrysler plant in Toledo, Ohio, to congratulate workers on the turnaround they helped bring about at Chrysler and the impact that saving the company had on the community. The President also announced new initiatives that will improve our manufacturing workforce, and welcomed German Chancellor Angela Merkel to the White House for an Official Visit. That's June 3 to June 9, or "Way to Get Our Money Back.": Friday, June 3, 2011; President Obama at Toledo Chrysler Plant: "I Placed My Bet on You"; Infographic The Resurgence of the American Automotive Industry; Weekly Address: Growing Manufacturing with the Auto Industry Turnaround; Monday, June 6, 2011; The Revitalization of American Cities with the Resurgence of the Auto Industry; Tuesday, June 7, 2011; President Obama on the Germany Official Visit: "A Partnership Between Our Peoples"; Inside the White House Kitchen: Preparing the State Dinner for Germany; Ambassador Capricia Penavic Marshall on Official Visit of Germany; Wednesday, June 8, 2011; Building Partnerships to Improve the Manufacturing Workforce; Welcoming the 2010 BCS National Champion Auburn Tigers to the White House
66	06/17/2011	"Where the Future Will Be Won"	This week, walk step-by-step with the President as he meets with his Jobs Council in North Carolina to discuss ideas that will accelerate job growth and improve America's competitiveness, tours a manufacturer of energy efficient lighting, travels to Puerto Rico, and more.: Monday, June 13; President Obama Visits North Carolina's Cree, Inc., and Meets with Council on Jobs and Competitiveness; President Obama Presented Ideas to Accelerate Job Growth and America's Competitiveness at Jobs Council Meeting; Tuesday, June 14: More Than Just History...; Wednesday, June 15; Strong Fathers, Strong Families; A Playground and a Picnic with Congressional Families.; Thursday, June 16: Reaffirming Commitment to Partnership Between the U.S. and Mongolia.
67	07/1/2011	"Magic Mountains and Volcanoes"	This week, The President spoke about innovation in Pittsburgh, PA, visited an advanced manufacturing facility in Iowa, held a news conference in the East Room and welcomed champion soccer and basketball teams to the White House. That's June 24 to June 30 or "Magic Mountains and Volcanoes".: Friday, June 24: President Obama tours the National Robotics Engineering Center at Carnegie Mellon University in Pittsburgh.; The President announces the Advanced Manufacturing Partnership.; Monday, June 27: The President welcomes Major League Soccer champion Colorado Rapids to the White House.; Tuesday, June 28: The President delivers remarks on the critical role the manufacturing sector plays in the American economy at the Alcoa Davenport Works plant in Bettendorf, Iowa.; Wednesday, June 29: President Obama holds a news conference in the East Room.; The President honors WNBA champion Seattle Storm at the White House.; The President speaks at an LGBT Pride Month Reception at the White House.; Thursday, June 30: The President travels to the Pentagon to attend the Armed Services farewell tribute in honor of Defense Secretary Robert Gates.
68	7/7/2011	"Ready to Tweet"	This week, President Obama celebrated Independence day with military families on the South Lawn, hosted a Twitter Town Hall on the economy and jobs and continued to work with leaders from both houses of Congress to find a balanced approach to reducing our long-term deficit. That's July 1 to July 7 or "Ready to Tweet!": Monday, July 4: Video: Fourth of July Celebration at the White House; What You Can Do To Support Military Families; Tuesday, July 5: Video: The President speaks about deficit reduction, read some of his remarks here; Wednesday, July 6: Full Footage: The President sends his first live tweet, and participates in the first ever Twitter Town Hall; Check out each question, with jump-links to the President's video response; Thursday, July 7: Video: The President speaks about deficit reduction, read some of his remarks here
69	7/14/2011	"Our Heroes Are All Around Us"	
70	7/21/2011	"Two Minute Warning"	
71	07/29/2011	"Mutual Disposition"	
72	8/5/2011	"Disaster Averted"	
73	8/12/2011	"Made In America"	
74	8/19/2011	"Get On The Bus"	
75	Special	Mailbag Day, Summer Edition 2011	
76	09/02/11	"Dispatches: Asia"	
77	09/9/11	"American Jobs Act"	
78	09/16/11	"Pass This Bill"	
79	09/23/11	"It's Math"	
80	09/30/11	"Set Your Sights High"	
81	10/07/11	"Why is that White House Pink?"	
82			

=== 2016 ===
No.	Week	Episode Name	Notes
301	04/29/2016	"Let's Have a Conversation" Obamas with the Royals (26488482612)	Last week we left you in Saudi Arabia, and this week, the President continued his travels abroad. In London, he met with the Queen, the Prime Minister, the Duke and Duchess of Cambridge, and actors bringing Shakespeare to life. In Germany, he witnessed innovation and technology hard at work at the Hannover Messe Fair. And back in Washington, D.C., the President hosted the U.S. Naval Academy football team and celebrated Passover. That's April 22 to April 28 or, "Let's Have a Conversation."
302	05/06/2016	"But Is It?" P050416PS-0544 (26754609401)	This week, the Vice President rounded out his trip overseas with a visit to both the Holy See and the Eternal City—and the First Lady headed to Los Angeles and Missouri. The President bid farewell to the current class of White House interns, hosted some of the biggest names in jazz, honored the teacher of the year & Cinco de Mayo, traveled to Flint, Michigan, and gave his final toast and roast at the annual White House Correspondence Dinner. That's April 29 to May 5 or..."But Is It?"
303	05/13/2016	"Stylin', Huh?" P051016ps-0358	This week, the President celebrated the 2016 graduating class of Howard University, hosted the 1983 National Champion North Carolina State Wolfpack, and the 2016 National Champion UConn Huskies. And the First Lady traveled to the Invictus Games in Orlando. That's May 6 to May 12 or, "Sylin', Huh?"
304	05/20/2016	"Miss Manners for Vikings" President Barack Obama addresses the Medal of Valor recipients in the Blue Room prior to the Medal of Valor ceremony in the East Room of the White House, May 16, 2016. (Official White House Photo by Pete Souza)	This week, the President hosted five Nordic leaders, spoke at the Rutgers Commencement ceremony, honored Medal of Valor recipients, and sat down in the Roosevelt Room for an interview, while the Vice President traveled to Columbus to talk about the new and improved Overtime Rule. That's May 13 to May 19 or, "A Miss Manners for Vikings."
305	05/29/2016	"Need a Little Beat?" Shinzō Abe and Barack Obama shaking hands at the Hiroshima Peace Memorial Park	This week, we visit Vietnam with President Obama, where the streets were lined to welcome his first trip to that country. From Vietnam, he traveled to the G7 Summit in Japan, and then made a historic trip to Hiroshima—becoming the first sitting US president to do so. That's May 21 to May 27 or, "Need a Little Beat?"
306	06/03/2016	"Hello Elkhart" President Barack Obama shakes hands with a U.S. Air Force Academy graduate as others celebrate, during the United States Air Force Academy commencement ceremony at Falcon Stadium in Colorado Springs, Colo., June 2, 2016 (Official White House Photo by Pete Souza)	This week, the President wrapped up his trip across the globe to Vietnam and Japan, honored our fallen heroes on Memorial Day at Arlington, traveled to Indiana to speak on the economy, and to Colorado to speak at the Air Force Academy commencement. He also welcomed this year's NCAA Men's Basketball champs the Villanova Wildcats to the White House. That's May 27 to June 2 or, "Hello, Elkhart."
307	06/10/2016	"Where's My Music?"	Welcome to the West Wing Week, your guide to everything that's happening at 1600 Pennsylvania Avenue. This week, the First Lady gave an inspiring commencement speech, the Broncos crashed the White House, and the President took a bite out of the big Apple. He also went live from the Oval, and hosted a reception to celebrate LGBT pride month. That's June 3 to June 10 or, "Where's My Music?"
308	06/17/2016	"We Will Stand with Orlando"	This week, the President's attention was focused on Orlando, and on the worst mass shooting in American history. The President called it an act of terror and an act of hate. He spent the week making clear that we would get to the bottom of what happened and stand with the people of Orlando, including the LGBT community that came under attack, as they mourned the loss of so many innocent loved ones. That's June 10 to June 16 or, "We Will Stand with Orlando."
309	06/24/2016	"How Cool Is This?" President Barack Obama looks upward as he tours Carlsbad Caverns with his family in Carlsbad, N.M., June 17, 2016. (Official White House Photo by Pete Souza)	This week was full of travel, as the First Family took a break from the big city—and a breath of fresh air—in Yosemite and the Carlsbad Caverns. Dr. Biden headed south to Central and South America, and the Vice President traced his roots in Ireland.
310	07/01/2016	"Pop and His People" First Lady Michelle Obama participates in a roundtable discussion with Freida Pinto and students, in support of the Let Girls Learn initiative, at R.S. Caulfield Senior High School in Unification Town, Liberia, June 27, 2016. (Official White House Photo by Amanda Lucidon)	This week, we follow the President to Silicon Valley and Ottawa, Canada, the First Lady to Liberia, Morocco and Spain, and the Vice President as he wraps up a trip to the land of his ancestors. That's June 24 to June 30 or, "Pop and His People."
311	07/08/2016	"This is an American Issue"	This week, the First Family invited military families to celebrate Independence Day in the East Room, and the President made an important decision to strengthen our national security. He then traveled to Poland for the NATO Summit. That's July 1 to July 7 or, "This is an American Issue."
312	07/15/2016	"One American Family"	This week, the President returned from his fifth and final NATO summit, traveled to Dallas to speak at a memorial service honoring the sacrifice of five fallen police officers, and hosted a meeting at the White House to talk about issues of race, policing, and justice. That's July 8 to July 14 or, "One American Family."
313	07/22/2016	"Do-Gooders"	This week, as the President addressed recent tragedies, he also celebrated the heroic efforts of our veterans, our progress in global development, and World Series champions. The First Lady met inspiring college kids - and crewmembers of the USS Enterprise. That's June 15 to June 21 or, "Do-Gooders."
