= Ernst =

Ernst is both a surname and a given name, the German, Dutch, and Scandinavian form of Ernest. Notable people with the name include:

== Given name ==
Ernst
- Pronunciation: English: /ɜːrnst, ɛərnst/ URNST, AIRNST; German: [ɛʁnst]
- Gender: male

Origin
- Origin: Germanic
- Meaning: "serious" (person)

Other names
- Related names: Ernest, Ernie

- Count Ernst of Lippe-Biesterfeld, regent of Lippe
- Ernst Anders (1845–1911), German painter
- Ernest August (disambiguation), multiple people
- Ernst Balz (1904–1945), German sculptor
- Ernst Evald Bergroth (1857–1925), Finnish entomologist
- Ernst Stavro Blofeld, evil genius from the James Bond novels and films
- Ernst Boepple (1887–1950), German Nazi official and SS officer executed for war crimes
- Ernst Brun Jr. (born 1990), American football player
- Ernst Cassirer (1874–1945), German Jewish philosopher
- Ernst Chain (1906–1979), German-born British biochemist
- Ernst Cohen (1869–1944), Dutch Jewish chemist known for his work on the allotropy of metals
- Ernst Ewald (1836–1904), German painter
- Ernst Gebauer (1799–1865), German painter
- Ernst Gombrich (1909–2001), Austrian art historian
- Ernst Haeckel (1834–1919), German biologist and illustrator
- Ernst Hammerschmidt (1928–1993), Austrian / German scholar of Ethiopia
- Ernst Happel (1925–1992), Austrian football (soccer) manager
- Ernst von Hesse-Wartegg (1851–1918), Austrian writer and traveller
- Ernst Reinhold von Hofmann (1801–1871), Russian geologist and mineralogist
- Ernst Jaakson (1905–1998), Estonian diplomat
- Ernst Jandl (1925–2000), Austrian writer, poet, and translator
- Ernst Jansz (born 1948), Dutch musician and founding member of Doe Maar
- Ernst Jünger (1895–1998), German writer
- Ernst Kaltenbrunner (1903–1946), Austrian-German Nazi SS police chief and war criminal, executed for war crimes
- Ernst Keil (1816–1878), German publisher
- Ernst Klenk (1896–1971), German biochemist
- Ernst af Klercker (1881–1955), Swedish general
- Ernst Koerner (1846–1927), German painter
- Ernst Kummer (1810–1893), German mathematician
- Ernst von der Lancken (1841–1902), Swedish Army major general
- Ernst Laraque (born 1970), Haitian judoka
- Ernst Larsen (1926–2015), Norwegian athlete
- Ernst Lauda (1859–1932), Austrian engineer
- Ernst Lubitsch (1892–1947), German-born Jewish film director
- Ernst Mach (1838–1916), physicist, coined the term "mach number"
- Ernst Mayr (1904–2005), evolutionary biologist, influential in the philosophy of biology
- Ernst Neizvestny (1925–2016), Russian sculptor
- Ernst Öpik (1893–1985), Estonian astronomer
- Ernst vom Rath (1909–1938), Nazi German diplomat
- Ernst Röhm (1887–1934), German military officer and co-founder of the Nazi SA (Stormtroopers)
- Ernst Rolf (1891–1932), Swedish artist
- Ernst Heinrich Roth (1877–1948), German luthier
- Ernst Ruska (1906–1988), a German physicist who won the Nobel Prize in Physics in 1986
- Ernst "Fritz" Sauckel, known as Fritz Sauckel (1894–1946), German Nazi politician, executed for war crimes
- Ernst Scholz (politician, born 1874) (1874–1932), German lawyer and politician
- Ernst Scholz (politician, born 1913) (1913–1986), German diplomat and politician
- Ernst Sieber (1927–2018), Swiss pastor, social worker, writer, politician and founder of the Sozialwerke Pfarrer Sieber relief organisation
- Ernst Jansen Steur (1945–2023), Dutch neurologist convicted on over twenty counts of harm
- Ernst Stimmel (1891–1978), German actor
- Ernst Stromer (1871–1952), German palaeontologist
- Ernst Thälmann (1886–1944), German communist politician and revolutionary
- Ernst Troeltsch (1865–1923), German Protestant theologian
- Ernst Udet (1896–1941), German flying ace
- Ernst van de Wetering (1938–2021), Dutch art historian considered to be the world's foremost expert on Rembrandt
- Ernst Zacharias (1924–2020), German musician
- Ernst Zermelo (1871–1953), set theorist
- Ernst Ziegler (1894–1974), German actor
- Ernst Zündel (1939–2017), German neo-Nazi and Holocaust denier

== Surname ==
- Ernst (surname)

== Pseudonym ==
- Ernst, pseudonym used by Matthias Jakob Schleiden

== See also ==
- Ernest (disambiguation)
