= Ernest Township, Dade County, Missouri =

Township in Dade County, Missouri, U.S.

Coordinates: 37.484669°N 93.941413°W

Ernest Township is a rural township in Dade County, in the U.S. state of Missouri. It is laid out as approximately a square, all farmland, with no organized communities currently within its boundaries and only an occasional residence. Missouri Highway 97, running south to north, runs through the township.

Ernest Township derives its name from Ernest Miller, a local postmaster.

Several streams flow through Ernest Township including Cedar Creek, Greaser Creek and Sons Creek.
