= Erik Ernst =

Danish computer scientist

- Awards: 2010 Dahl-Nygaard Prize.
- Scientific career
- Fields: Computer Science

Erik Ernst is a prominent computer scientist and an associate professor at the University of Aarhus in Denmark. In 2010, he won the Dahl-Nygaard Prize.
