= Christina Ernst =

American engineer and social media creator

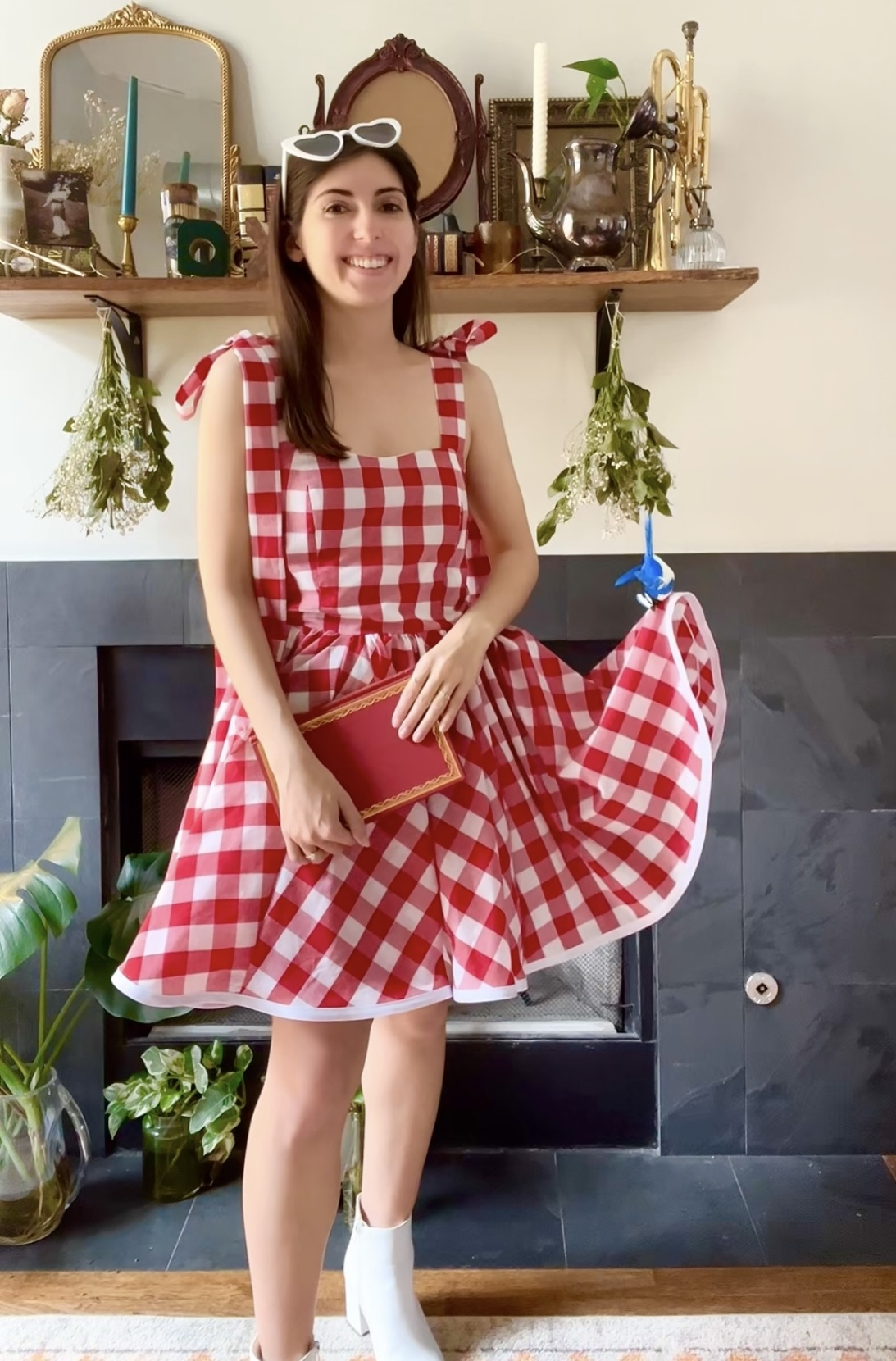
- Ernst in 2025

Instagram information
- Page: shebuildsrobots
- Years active: 2022–present
- Genre: Engineering
- Followers: 585 thousand (03 Aug 2026)
- Website: www.shebuildsrobots.org

Christina Ernst is an American engineer and social media content creator known for her work in "fashioneering," a portmanteau for the integration of fashion and engineering. Ernst has received media coverage for her viral wearable technology projects and her educational initiative She Builds Robots. She was a recurring guest on Season 6 of the CBS WKND television show Mission Unstoppable.

== Education ==
Ernst attended the University of Illinois Urbana-Champaign, where she was the recipient of the Alwan Engineering Scholarship. She graduated in 2019 with a Bachelor of Science in Computer Engineering.

At a 2017 college hackathon, she created a Bluetooth-controlled, color-changing dress. Ernst was struck by the enthusiastic response from young women and girls who approached her, expressing a desire to learn to code specifically to create similar projects. Following the event, she received a grant which provided the seed funding for what would become her educational initiative She Builds Robots.

== Career ==
=== Maker-in-Residency ===
In the fall of 2024, Ernst served as the Maker-in-Residence at the Chicago Public Library Maker Lab, located in Harold Washington Library. During her residency, she taught free public workshops on coding, circuits, and motor control. Her final project for the residency was a motorized dress inspired by Jackson Park’s Garden of the Phoenix, which was put on public display at the library.

=== Science communication ===
In October 2024, Ernst posted a video of one of her engineering projects, a motorized character from the film Ratatouille. The video went viral and was covered in publications such as Popular Science, The CBC, Entertainment Weekly, and CNN.

In late 2024 and early 2025, Ernst had a recurring role on Season 6 of Mission Unstoppable, a STEM-focused educational television show on CBS hosted by Miranda Cosgrove.

In April 2025, Ernst was a keynote speaker for the Women In Tech Sweden conference, where she emphasized the shared themes between textiles and computing.
