= Earnest (surname) =

Earnest is a surname, and may refer to:

- Adele Earnest (1901–1993), American art collector and historian
- Conrad Earnest (born 1957), American soccer player and exercise physiologist
- Dakota Earnest (born 1993), American trampoline gymnast
- G. Brooks Earnest (1902–1992), American academic administrator
- Herbert L. Earnest (1895–1970), United States Army major general
- James Earnest (1818–1900), American politician from Wisconsin
- John Earnest (born 1999), perpetrator of the Poway synagogue shooting
- Josh Earnest (born 1975), American political advisor
- Les Earnest (1930–2024), American computer scientist
- Matthew Earnest, American theater director
- Peter Earnest (1934–2022), American intelligence officer

== See also ==
- Ernst
