= Wallace Roy Ernst =

American botanist (1928–1971)

- Born: 1928
- Died: 1971 (aged 42–43)
- Citizenship: USA
- Scientific career
- Fields: Botany
- Institutions: Smithsonian Institution; United States National Museum

Wallace Roy Ernst (1928–1971) was an American botanist.

== Biography ==
Ernst was born in 1928. In 1963, he was hired by the Smithsonian Institution for a position as associate curator of phanerogams in the Botany Department of the United States National Museum, and was appointed as a curator there in 1970. His keen interest was the cytology, morphology, taxonomy of flowering plants, including such families as Fumariaceae, Loasaceae, and Papaveraceae. He became a member of Bredin-Archbold-Smithsonian Biological Survey, and journeyed to Dominica with the crew in 1964 and 1965. In 1966, he joined the archeological expedition to the Valley of Oaxaca in Mexico for two months, under the supervision of Kent Flannery. He also joined with Albert C. Smith, to collect flora from Fiji island, a project which was financed by the National Science Foundation. He died in 1971.
