= Jay Carney =

Former White House Press Secretary

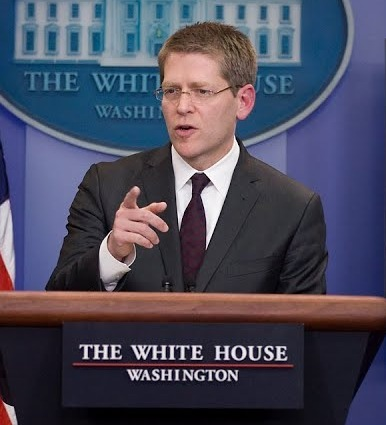
- Carney in February 2011

28th White House Press Secretary
- In office February 11, 2011 – June 20, 2014
- President: Barack Obama
- Deputy: Josh Earnest
- Preceded by: Robert Gibbs
- Succeeded by: Josh Earnest

Personal details
- Born: James Ferguson Carney; May 22, 1965 (age 61) Washington, D.C., U.S.
- Party: Democratic
- Spouse: Claire Shipman (divorced)
- Children: 2
- Education: Yale University (BA)

James Ferguson "Jay" Carney (born May 22, 1965) is an American public relations officer and former journalist who served as the 28th White House press secretary from 2011 to 2014. He worked as Amazon's senior vice president of global corporate affairs from 2015 to 2022. Since 2022, he has been global head of policy and communications at Airbnb.

As President Obama's chief spokesman for more than three years, he remains the longest-serving White House press secretary of the twenty-first century. During the first two years of the Obama administration, Carney was director of communications for then-Vice President Joe Biden.

Prior to his government service, Carney worked for 20 years at Time Magazine, and was the magazine's Washington bureau chief from 2005 to 2008. As a Washington-based reporter, Carney appeared frequently on various political talk shows, including This Week with George Stephanopoulos for ABC News.

== Early life and education ==
Jay Carney was born James Ferguson Carney. Raised in Northern Virginia, Carney attended high school at the Lawrenceville School in Lawrenceville, New Jersey, and earned a bachelor's degree in Russian and Eastern European studies from Yale University in 1987.

== Career ==
=== Time magazine ===
After working as a reporter for The Miami Herald, in his first job after college, Carney joined Time magazine as the Miami bureau chief, in December 1988. A Russian speaker, he worked as a correspondent in the Time Moscow bureau for three years, from 1990 to 1993, covering the collapse of the Soviet Union. He transferred to Washington, D.C., in mid-1993, to report on the Bill Clinton White House. He covered Clinton's first term, the Newt Gingrich-led GOP Congress, and Clinton's impeachment by the U.S. House of Representatives. He was a traveling correspondent on the 2000 presidential campaigns of Texas Governor George W. Bush and Senator John McCain, and White House correspondent for Bush's first term as president. Carney was one of a few reporters who were aboard Air Force One with President Bush on September 11, 2001. Carney was the Time Washington bureau deputy chief from 2003 to 2005 and then bureau chief, from September 2005 until December 2008.

=== White House Press Secretary ===
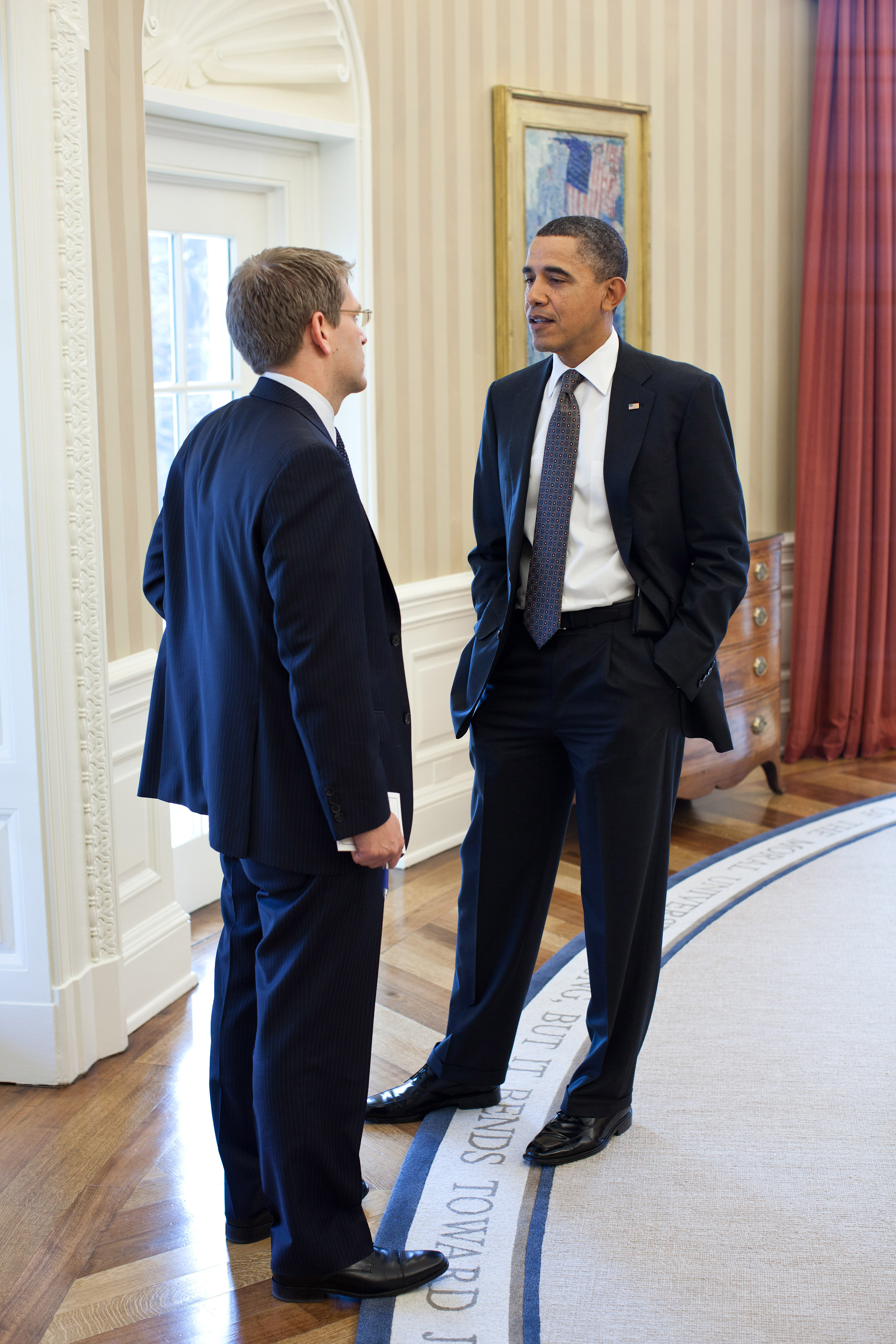
Jay Carney talks with President Obama in the Oval Office, February 17, 2011

On December 15, 2008, Carney left the private sector to take a position as director of communications to Vice President-elect Joe Biden.

On January 27, 2011, Carney was selected to become the Obama Administration's second White House press secretary. He was named the successor to previous press secretary Robert Gibbs by White House chief of staff, William M. Daley. Carney was one of fourteen White House appointees announced by Daley on that day.

Carney served as press secretary during a series of key moments in the Obama presidency, including: the so-called "Birther movement" publicized by Donald Trump and Fox News; the killing of Osama bin Laden in a raid on his compound in Abbottabad, Pakistan, by U.S. special operations; Obama's announcement of his support for same-sex marriage; Obama's election to a second term; the Sandy Hook shooting in Newtown, Connecticut; the passage of the American Taxpayer Relief Act, which addressed sequestration and the fiscal cliff and raised rates on high earners while extending the Bush tax cuts for most Americans; the implementation of the Affordable Care Act, better known as Obamacare; the government shutdown of October 2013; the shooting of Trayvon Martin; and the imposition of sanctions against Russia for its invasion and annexation of Crimea.

On May 30, 2014, President Barack Obama announced Carney would be succeeded by Josh Earnest. At three years, five months on the job, Carney was the longest-serving press secretary after Michael McCurry in the mid-1990s.

=== CNN commentator ===
Following his stint as press secretary, Carney worked as a CNN senior political analyst, from September 2014 to February 2015.

=== Amazon ===
On March 2, 2015, Carney began working for Amazon as the senior vice president of global corporate affairs. He initially managed a lobbying and public-policy group of approximately two dozen employees; by 2021, that had increased to approximately 250 employees. Between 2014 and 2020, the number of registered lobbyists for Amazon tripled, to at least 180. He visited China in 2018 to promote Kindle devices and electronic books in the Chinese market.

=== Controversial statements ===
Twice during the month of October 2019, Carney made public comments that some viewed as controversial. The first was when he contrasted the Bush and Clinton administrations with the Trump administration. Carney said, "Virtually with no exception, everyone I dealt with in those administrations, whether I personally agreed or disagreed with what they thought were the right policy decisions or the right way to approach things, I never doubted that they were patriots.” and “I don’t feel that way now." He later tweeted that he had respect for countless patriots working in the United States government.

During the sixth game of the 2019 World Series, Carney sent out a tweet complaining about the officiating of the game. Carney tweeted that the officiating was a "disgrace", dubbing the umpires "a bunch of overweight, diabetic, half-blind geriatrics". He apologized the following day.

=== Joining Airbnb ===
In July 2022, it was announced that Carney was joining Airbnb as global head of policy and communications.

== Awards ==
In 2003, Carney won the Gerald R. Ford prize for distinguished reporting on the presidency of the United States of America.

== Personal life ==
Carney has two children with his former wife, Claire Shipman. Carney serves on the board of directors of the Urban Institute, Human Rights First, Airbnb.org, and Tech:NYC. He is a devoted fan of the indie rock band Guided by Voices.

Political offices
Preceded by Robert Gibbs	White House Press Secretary; 2011–2014	Succeeded by Josh Earnest
