= Tony Ernst =

Swedish journalist and writer

Tony Nicolai Ernst (born 31 October 1966) is a journalist and writer about Swedish hip hop, based in Malmö, Sweden. He is the founder of Gidappa, which describes itself as "The Only Swedish Magazine about Black Music".

== Jan Majlard rivalry ==
In 2004, Tony Ernst criticized Swedish journalist Jan Majlard for several attacks on the Swedish soccer star Zlatan Ibrahimović, including a personal attack where Majlard compared Zlatan with Mike Tyson. A debate between Ernst and Majlard followed, where Ernst explained that "he wouldn't walk out of a press conference in case the star player avoided answering a question", referring to when Majlard left a press conference after Zlatan refused to answer his question. The rivalry heated up in 2006, when Majlard wrote an article for Svenska Dagbladet where he attacked Ernst again.

The day after a derby game between Djurgården and Hammarby was stopped following hooliganism among Hammarby supporters, Majlard wrote an article for Svenska Dagbladet where he attacked Ernst again, and only referred to him as "a cultural worker". He also pointed out that Ernst was a member of MFF Support, Malmö FF's official fan club, and called him a "hooligan with a goosepen".

Ernst responded with an article on a Malmö FF fan site where he criticized Swedish sports journalism, and focused on Majlard labelling MFF Support as hooligans. Ernst pointed out that MFF Support have worked against violence, racism, and hooliganism. And he also criticized Majlard for "labelling MFF Support's 4.000 members as hooligans". Majlard's one-word response to Ernst' article was "Skvallerbyttabingbång!" ("Nyah-nyah, you tattler!")

Ernst was the chairman of MFF Support from 2006 until 2009.
