= Siegrid Ernst =

German pianist and composer (1929–2022)

Siegrid Ernst (3 March 1929 – 20 March 2022) was a German pianist, music educator and composer.

== Biography ==
Siegrid Ernst was born in Ludwigshafen am Rhein and studied piano, violin and music theory as a child. She later studied piano and composition in Heidelberg, Frankfurt and Vienna, at the University of Music and Dramatic Art in Heidelberg and Mannheim and at the University of the Arts Bremen. After completing her studies, she performed contemporary music both solo and in chamber ensembles for concerts and radio productions, and taught piano and composition, music theory and improvisation. She became successful as a composer, and her works have been performed in Europe, the United States, Mexico and Japan.

Since 1998 she has been chair of the jury of the Bremer composers competition. She has worked with the German Music Council and has chaired the "Women and Music" International Working Group Association. She was co-founder of the International Congress of Women in Music.

== Honors and awards ==
- Grant from the Federal Republic of Germany for the Cité internationale des arts in Paris, 1981.
- Honorary professor of the Inter American University of Humanistic Studies, Florida, 1989.

== Works ==
Ernst composed chamber music, songs cycles, cantatas, orchestral works, children's music and opera. She also created improvisations. Selected works include:

- Variationen für großes Orchester (1965)
- Quattro mani dentro e fuori (1975)
- 7 Miniaturen nach japanischen Haiku (1961)
- Triade (1994)
- Concertantes Duo (1991)
- eﾅstaremo freschi (1992)
- Peace Now (1996)

Her works have been recorded and issued on six CDs, including:

- Chamber MusicAudio CD (August 1, 1996), Vienna Modern Master, ASIN: B000004A6I
- New Music For Orchestra: Music from Six Continents (1997) Vienna Modern Masters, ASIN: B002X3NAZE
- Music From 6 Continents (June 24, 1997) Vienna Modern Masters, ASIN: B000004A75
