= Earnest Frank =

American football coach

Biographical details
- Education: Doane College

Coaching career (HC unless noted)
- 1913: Doane
- 1917–1919: York
- 1921: York
- 1922–1925: Grand Island

Head coaching record
- Overall: 18–8–2

Accomplishments and honors

Championships
- 1 NIC (1919)

Earnest Frank was an American football coach. He served as the head football coach at Doane College in Crete, Nebraska in 1913, York College in York, Nebraska from 1917 to 1919 and again in 1921, and Grand Island College in Grand Island, Nebraska from 1922 to 1925. His record at Doane was 5–1–2.

== Head coaching record ==
Year	Team	Overall	Conference	Standing	Bowl/playoffs
Doane Tigers (Independent) (1913)
1913	Doane	5–1–2			
Doane:		5–1–2			
York Panthers (Nebraska Intercollegiate Conference) (1917–1919)
1917	York	4–2			
1918	No team—World War I				
1919	York	6–0	6–0	1st	
York Panthers (Nebraska Intercollegiate Conference) (1921)
1921	York	3–5	3–4	7th	
York:		13–7			
Grand Island Zebras (Nebraska Intercollegiate Conference / Nebraska College Athletic Conference) (1922–1925)
1922	Grand Island		4–2–1	T–6th	
1923	Grand Island	5–4	4–3	6th	
1924	Grand Island	5–1–1	5–1	T–3rd	
1925	Grand Island	1–4–3	1–4–3	T–9th	
Grand Island:			14–10–4		
Total:					
National championship Conference title Conference division title or championship game berth
