= Gundolf Ernst =

German geologist and mineralogist (1930–2002)

- Born: August 29, 1930; Hamburg
- Died: April 25, 2002 (aged 71); Berlin
- Education: University of Hamburg
- Known for: Research of Cretaceous stratifications
- Scientific career
- Fields: Geology, Mineralogy, Palaeontology
- Workplaces: Braunschweig University of Technology, Free University of Berlin
- Doctoral advisor: Friedrich Karl Drescher-Kaden
- Doctoral students: 4

Gundolf Ernst (August 29, 1930 – April 25, 2002) was a German geologist and mineralogist.

Gundolf Ernst was the son of Wilhelm Ernst, geologist at Hamburg University, and his wife Elisabeth, née Thüme. He grew up in Ahrensburg and came in contact with the archaeologist Alfred Rust while still a boy. After his graduation he studied geology at Hamburg University and finished his doctoral thesis in the field of mineralogy in 1961. He became a specialist in the study of the Cretaceous, especially fossilized sea urchins of this period. From 1964 to 1976 he worked as a paleontologist at the Braunschweig University of Technology. In 1976 he became a professor at the Free University of Berlin, where he continued until retirement. His research led him to many countries, among others England, Spain, Poland, Tanzania and the Adriatic Sea coast.

== Selected works ==
- Zur Kenntnis der Grüngesteine und Sedimente des südwestlichen Zlatibor-Massivs (Bosnien), Dissertation Hamburg 1961
- The Stratigraphical Value of the Echinoids in the Boreal Upper Cretaceous, Newsl. Stratigr, 1 (1970), pp. 19–34 (Leiden)
- Die irregulären Echiniden der nordwestdeutschen Oberkreide: ihre Phylogenie, Ökomorphologie und Stratigraphie, Habilitationsschrift Braunschweig 1970/72
- Biostratigraphie des Miozäns im Raum von Wacken (Westholstein), (with Winfried Hinsch), Hannover und Braunschweig 1972
- Concepts and Methods of Echinoid Biostratigraphy. In: E. G. Kauffman and J. E. Hazel (ed.), Concepts and Methods of Biostratigraphy, pp. 541–563 (with E. Seiberitz), Stroudsburg 1977
- Neue Ergebnisse zur Multistratigraphie, Sedimentologie und Palökologie der Oberkreide von Niedersachsen und Westfalen unter besonderer Berücksichtigung des Cenoman bis Coniac (with D.-D. Dahmer and H. Hilbrecht), Berlin 1986
