= Ernest River =

River in Western Australia

Coordinates: 15°13′54″S 127°34′20″E

Location
- Country: Australia

Physical characteristics
- Source
  - location: Tadarida Scarp
  - elevation: 360 metres (1,181 ft)
- Mouth
  - location: Forrest River
  - elevation: 113 metres (371 ft)
- Length: 68 km (42 mi)

The Ernest River is a river in the Kimberley region of Western Australia.

The headwaters of the river rise in the Drysdale River National Park at the foot of Tadarida Scarp. The river flows easterly until discharging into the Forrest River, of which it is a tributary.

The river was named by the Victoria Squatting Company surveyor Charles Burrowes.
