= Waltraud Ernst =

German medical historian (born 1955)

Waltraud Ernst (born 1955) is a German professor of the history of medicine at Oxford Brookes University. She is a specialist in the history of psychiatry.

She attended the University of Konstanz and obtained her PhD from the School of Oriental and African Studies in 1987 for a dissertation on psychiatry and mental illness in South Asia, c. 1780 – 1858.

== Selected publications ==
- Race, Science and Medicine, 1700–1960. Routledge, New York, 1999. (Edited with Bernard Harris) ISBN 0415181526
- Plural Medicine, Tradition and modernity, 1800–2000. Routledge, London, 2002. (Editor) ISBN 0415231221
- Histories of the Normal and the Abnormal: Social and cultural histories of norms and normativity. Routledge, London, 2006. ISBN 9780415368438
- Mad Tales from the Raj: Colonial Psychiatry in South Asia, 1800-58. Anthem Press, London, 2010. (Anthem South Asian Studies) ISBN 978-1843318682
- Colonialism and Transnational Psychiatry: The Development of an Indian Mental Hospital in British India, c. 1925 – 1940. Anthem Press, London, 2013. ISBN 978 0 85728 019 0
- Work, Psychiatry and Society, c.1750–2015. Manchester University Press, Manchester, 2016. (Editor) ISBN 9780719097690
