= Brooklyn Institute for Social Research =

Non-profit research institute

The Brooklyn Institute for Social Research
- New York City; United States

Information
- Established: 2011
- Founder: Ajay Singh Chaudhary
- Website: thebrooklyninstitute.com

Brooklyn Institute for Social Research (BISR), founded in 2011, is a non-profit interdisciplinary education and research institute based in New York City that offers university-style seminar classes, primarily in the humanities and social sciences, to working-age adult learners. Alongside classes, BISR supports public research, programs with labor, non-profit, and activist organizations, and independent scholarly work outside the university. The Institute also produces a series of podcasts and hosts scholarly, cultural, and political events both in-person and online. BISR is not a traditional degree-granting educational institution. Rather, students enroll on a per-course basis to learn about topics that interest them. BISR's offices, library, and main classroom spaces are located in New York City while it has held classes and established branches in Philadelphia, Chicago, London, and across the Midwest. BISR classes typically take place in the evenings in a variety of public spaces, including its own classrooms and library, museums, bars, bookstores, and community spaces. Since 2020, BISR has also offered seminars and other programming online with students and faculty as far away as Mozambique and China. As of 2022, the Institute had more than 13000 alumni and an annual student body of over 3000 students.

== History ==
BISR was founded in 2011 by current executive director Ajay Singh Chaudhary. As a doctoral candidate at Columbia's Institute for Comparative Literature and Society, Chaudhary conceived of BISR "as something of an alternative—for both students and professors—to our current higher education system."

The institute's first faculty were fellow Columbia Ph.D. candidates Christine Smallwood, Abby Kluchin, and Michael Brent. The institute emphasizes "pedagogy and interdisciplinary work".

The first course offered by BISR, in January 2012, was "Politics of the City", a study of ancient Greek political philosophy. Other early courses included "Dreams and Hysteria: An Introduction to Freud", "Shocks and Phantasmagoria: Walter Benjamin and the Arcades Project", "Telegraphs, Pneumatic Tubes and Teleportation; Or, the Way We Communicate Now", "Philosophy and Film" and "Realism".

Side by side with its course offerings, BISR also runs a number of projects and programs. The Podcast for Social Research is "a forum for the school's staff to discuss books, films, current affairs, and other pressing concerns". Days of Learning offers an opportunity for students "to learn about a particular topic – like Melville and the literature of Wall Street or Hannah Arendt – with no required preparations."

From its founding in 2011 through the fall of 2015, it offered between 12 and 20 courses a year. Between 2015 and 2016, it offered 70 courses and enrolled 1,000 students. By mid-2016, BISR had 40 faculty members in total. In 2017, it offered over 85 classes in New York City alone.

== Campus ==
BISR classes typically take place in the evenings in a variety of public spaces, including museums, bars, bookstores, and community spaces.

In recent years BISR has expanded and diversified its programming, offering sliding-scale courses across the Midwest through BISR Network, political education to labor and community groups through BISR Praxis, free courses to disadvantaged communities through Community Initiative, and discounted courses to public school teachers through Educator Access.

BISR currently holds courses in New York City, Philadelphia, as well as smaller centers in Michigan, Ohio, and Kentucky.

== See also ==
- Core Curriculum (Columbia College)
- University of Frankfurt Institute for Social Research
