= Sons Creek =

Stream in the US state of Missouri

Sons Creek is a stream in Dade County in the U.S. state of Missouri. It is a tributary of the Sac River within Stockton Lake.

The stream begins at the confluence of the west and south prongs about five miles northwest of Greenfield at 37°27′19″N 93°55′15″W and the stream flows generally northeast to enter a prong of Stockton Lake just west of the Missouri Route 39 bridge south of Neola. Prior to the flooding of Stockton Lake the stream continued to the northeast to join the Sac River just north of the Ruark Bluff Park and east of the Missouri Route H bridge at 37°32′02″N 93°47′44″W.

Sons Creek has the name of one Mr. Son, a pioneer who settled there in the 1820s.

== See also ==
- List of rivers of Missouri
