= Earnest Mudzengi =

Earnest Mudzengi was the national director of the Zimbabwean National Constitutional Assembly (NCA) until 2010.

== History ==
Mudzengi attended high school in Gweru, and later attained a master's degree in Media and Communication Studies from the University of Zimbabwe (UZ) in 2001. While at UZ, Mudzengi was actively involved in student activism, becoming the Chairperson of the UZ Political Orientation Committee in 1997. He was also a special Adviser to the Student Representative Council (SRC) between 1996 and 1997.

In 2002, Mudzengi joined the National Constitutional Assembly (NCA), initially as an Information and Advocacy Officer. He has been detained by police on several occasions, at one point being detained for four days without trial, as well as being severely assaulted. Apart from his work at NCA, Mudzengi is a part-time media studies lecturer with the Zimbabwe Open University where he has assisted with the authoring of a number of modules in disciplines that include political communication, investigative journalism, media management and others.
