= Earnestville =

Earnestville or Ernestville may refer to:

- Earnestville, Kentucky
- Earnestville, Florida, a former town in Pasco County, Florida
- Ernestville, Missouri
