= Ernest (disambiguation) =

Ernest is a masculine given name.

Ernest may also refer to:

- Ernest, Pennsylvania, United States, a borough
- Ernest Township, Dade County, Missouri, United States
- Ernest Airlines, a defunct Italian airline
- Ernest River, Western Australia
- Cyclone Ernest, two Indian Ocean tropical cyclones
- John Ernest (1922-1994), American abstract artist and mathematician
- Ian Ernest (born 1954), Mauritian Anglican Archbishop of the Indian Ocean and Bishop of Mauritius
- Ernest (musician), American country music artist
