= HMS Earnest =

Three ships of the British Royal Navy have been named HMS Earnest:

- HMS Earnest (1805) was a 12-gun gun-brig launched at Lieth in 1805 and sold in 1816. She then became the merchantman Earnest and continued to sail until 1850.
- HMS Earnest (1856) was a wood screw gunboat launched in 1856 and sold in 1895.
- HMS Earnest (1896) was a destroyer launched in 1896 and sold in 1920
