= Susan G. Ernst =

American biologist

Susan G. Ernst is professor emerita at Tufts University known for her work on cell development using sea urchins as a model system. She is an elected fellow of the American Association for the Advancement of Science.

== Academic career ==
Ernst graduated with honors from Louisiana State University in 1968 with a B.S. in zoology. She received her Ph.D. in zoology in 1975 from the University of Massachusetts Amherst. After completing postdoctoral fellowships first at Case Western Reserve and then the California Institute of Technology, Ernst became an assistant professor at Tufts University in 1979. From 1997 to 2005, Ernst held a number of deanships at Tufts serving, most notably, as the dean of the School of Arts and Sciences from 2001 to 2005. Throughout this time she continued to teach undergraduate and graduate courses and pursue her research. In 2005, Ernst returned to teaching and research full-time.

== Research ==
Her research is in developmental biology and primarily focuses on the role of the Endo16 gene in embryogenesis. She uses the sea urchin as her model system for research. Her work includes investigations into RNA in sea urchins, and the proteins produced during the development of sea urchins. Ernst has mentored undergraduate students, including Michael Levin who worked with her on applying electrical fields to sea urchin embryos.

== Selected publications ==
- Ernst, Susan G.; Hough-Evans, Barbara R.; Britten, Roy J.; Davidson, Eric H. (1980). "Limited complexity of the RNA in micromeres of sixteen-cell sea urchin embryos". Developmental Biology. 79 (1): 119–127. doi:10.1016/0012-1606(80)90077-9. PMID 6157591.
- Yoon, Kyunglim L.; Aprille, June R.; Ernst, Susan G. (1991). "Mitochondrial tRNAthr mutation in fatal infantile respiratory enzyme deficiency". Biochemical and Biophysical Research Communications. 176 (3): 1112–1115. doi:10.1016/0006-291X(91)90399-R. PMID 1645537.
- Chang, L.; Loranger, S. S.; Mizzen, C.; Ernst, S. G.; Allis, C. D.; Annunziato, A. T. (1997-01-01). "Histones in Transit: Cytosolic Histone Complexes and Diacetylation of H4 During Nucleosome Assembly in Human Cells". Biochemistry. 36 (3): 469–480. doi:10.1021/bi962069i. ISSN 0006-2960. PMID 9012662.
- Ernst, Susan G. (2011-10-15). "Offerings from an Urchin". Developmental Biology. Special Section: History of Developmental Biology. 358 (2): 285–294. doi:10.1016/j.ydbio.2011.06.021. ISSN 0012-1606. PMID 21723860.

== Awards and honors ==
Ernst was elected a fellow of the American Association for the Advancement of Science in 1997.
