= Supply Chain Management Review =

- Type: business magazine
- Format: Paper and online magazine
- Owner: Peerless Media
- President: Brian Ceraolo
- Editor: Bob Trebilcock
- Founded: 1997
- Language: English
- Headquarters: Framingham, Massachusetts, USA
- Circulation: 15,000
- ISSN: 1521-9747
- Website: Supply Chain Management Review

Supply Chain Management Review (SCMR) is a U.S.-based business management magazine. SCMR covers analysis and trends in supply chain management.

== History ==
Supply Chain Management Review began in 1997, coinciding with the development of the supply-chain operations reference (SCOR) model. Initially, the magazine was established as a quarterly, then increased its frequency to six issues per year. In 2007, the magazine added a special seventh issue in December, consisting primarily of its annual Executive Guide to Supply Chain Resources. As of December 2013, the total BPA audited circulation was 15,133 subscribers.

The CEO of Peerless Media is Brian Ceraolo. The chief editor is Brian Straight, with the editorial offices located in Framingham, Massachusetts, USA.

Supply Chain Management Review was closed on April 16, 2010, as per Reed Elsevier's (its parent company) decision to exit the majority of its business information - US publishing business. On April 23, Reed sold its closed Supply Chain publications to a new company, Peerless Media, formed by Brian Ceraolo, former Group Publisher.

== Content ==
Following a similar model to the Harvard Business Review, SCMR primarily publishes columns and features contributed by business school professors, supply chain management practitioners and industry analysts. The magazine covers topics including sourcing and procurement, software and technology, transportation and logistics, supply chain education, and other topics relating to the supply chain. SCMR also publishes numerous case studies featuring companies such as Wal-Mart, Motorola, IBM and Pfizer.
