= Josh Earnest =

American political advisor (born 1975)

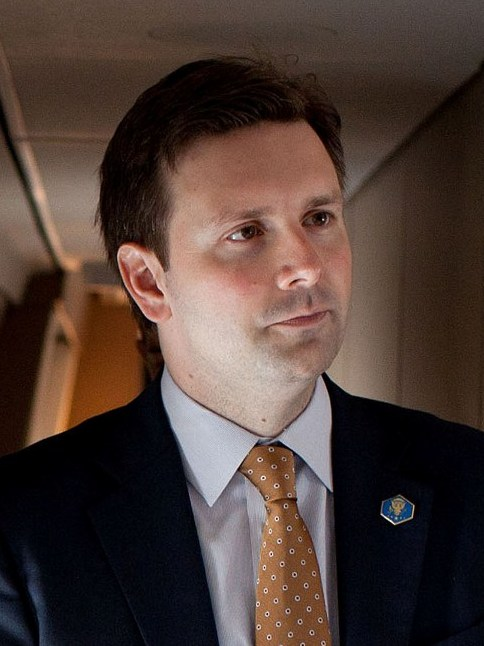

29th White House Press Secretary
- In office June 20, 2014 – January 20, 2017
- President: Barack Obama
- Deputy: Eric Schultz
- Preceded by: Jay Carney
- Succeeded by: Sean Spicer

White House Deputy Press Secretary
- In office February 11, 2011 – June 20, 2014
- President: Barack Obama
- Secretary: Jay Carney
- Preceded by: Bill Burton
- Succeeded by: Eric Schultz

Personal details
- Born: Joshua Ryan Henry Earnest; January 22, 1975 (age 51) Kansas City, Missouri, U.S.
- Party: Democratic
- Spouse: Natalie Wyeth (m. 2012)
- Children: 2
- Education: Rice University (BA)

Joshua Ryan Henry Earnest (born January 22, 1975) is an American political advisor who served as White House press secretary under President Barack Obama from 2014 to 2017. He was Obama's third Press Secretary and the 29th to hold the position. He succeeded Jay Carney as Obama's press secretary, in 2014, and was succeeded by President Donald Trump's first presidential press secretary, Sean Spicer. He is Executive Vice President of Communications and Advertising for United Airlines.

== Early life and education ==
Earnest was born in Kansas City, Missouri, the son of Donald H. Earnest, an athletic director, and Jeanne M. Earnest, a psychologist. He attended The Barstow School, a private secondary school, on a scholarship.

He graduated from Rice University, in 1997, with a degree in political science and policy studies. Earnest was a member of Sid Richardson College and was the campus-wide beer bike coordinator while at Rice University.

== Career ==
Immediately following college, he worked for Lee P. Brown during the 1997 Houston mayoral election. Earnest served as a congressional aide to U.S. congressman Robert Marion Berry, from 2002 to 2003 after working on Michael Bloomberg's first campaign for mayor of New York City.

After working on Capitol Hill, Earnest worked for the Democratic National Committee, from 2003 to 2006, under both Terry McAuliffe and Howard Dean. Earnest was Jim Davis' communications director during Davis' 2006 gubernatorial campaign in Florida. He moved to Iowa, in December 2006, to serve as national communications director for then-Iowa governor Tom Vilsack's presidential campaign.

He then joined Barack Obama's presidential campaign in March 2007 as Obama's Iowa communications director. After Obama's Iowa caucus victory, Earnest worked as a top communications aide in several primary contests including South Carolina, Texas and Pennsylvania. During the 2008 general election, Earnest served as the campaign's deputy communication director. After Obama was elected president, Earnest moved to Washington, D.C., and served as the communications director for the presidential inaugural committee.

Earnest started at the White House on Obama's first full day in office, January 21, 2009, as deputy press secretary under Robert Gibbs. Later, Earnest was promoted and served as principal deputy White House press secretary and chief of staff to Jay Carney, occasionally filling in during press briefings. Earnest was the voice of West Wing Week, an online video series produced by the White House that chronicled President Barack Obama's activities each week.

On May 30, 2014, Obama announced that Josh Earnest would succeed Carney as the White House press secretary. In an annual survey conducted by the Politico Magazine in April 2015, he was voted the most helpful press official in the Obama administration and the best White House press secretary by nearly 70 journalists.

He delivered his last press briefing of the Obama administration on January 17, 2017, in which he was surprised by Obama, who then lauded Earnest for his years of service under his administration.

Earnest has worked as a political analyst and commentator for NBC News and MSNBC since March 2017.

In May 2018, Earnest began serving as Senior Vice President and Chief Communications Officer for United Airlines, based at their headquarters in Chicago. In September 2023, he was promoted to Executive Vice President of Communications and Advertising. He also serves on the Board of Advisors of Let America Vote, an organization founded by former Missouri Secretary of State Jason Kander that aims to end voter suppression.

== Personal life ==
In August 2012, Earnest married Natalie Wyeth in a Christian ceremony at the Four Seasons Hotel in Washington, D.C. His wife is a great-granddaughter of illustrator N. C. Wyeth, a granddaughter of engineer Nathaniel C. Wyeth, and a former veteran Treasury Department official. They have a son and a daughter.

Political offices
Preceded by Jay Carney	White House Press Secretary; 2014–2017	Succeeded by Sean Spicer
