= 2019–20 European windstorm season =

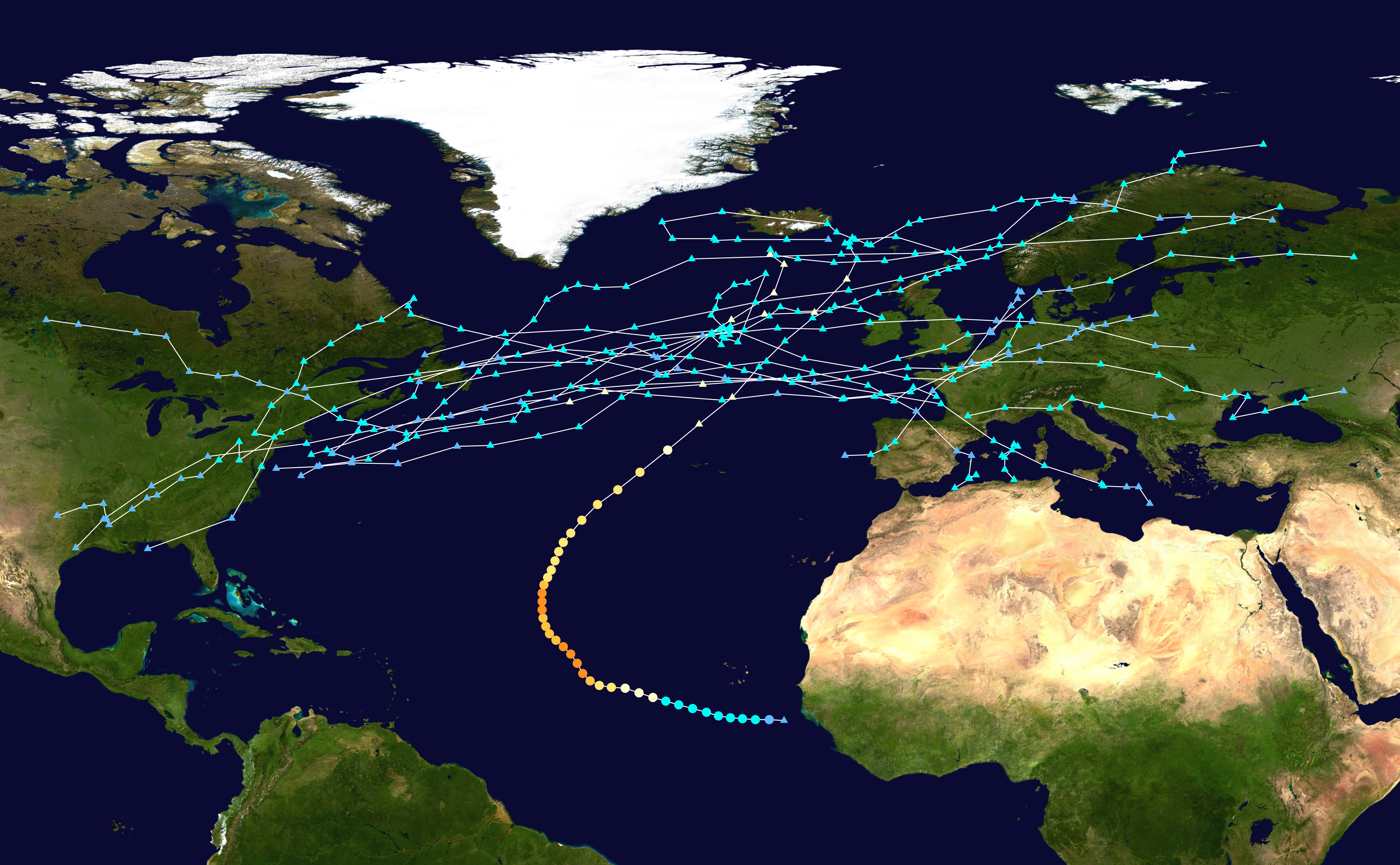
- Map of systems formed in this season.
- First storm formed: 2 October 2019
- Last storm dissipated: 26 September 2020
- Strongest storm^{1}: Dennis; 920 mbar (27.2 inHg)
- Strongest wind gust: Dennis 230 km/h (140 mph)
- Total storms: 24
- Total damage: £895 million (€1.06 billion)
- Total fatalities: 78 (+12 missing)
- ^{1}Strongest storm is determined by lowest pressure and maximum recorded non-mountainous wind gust is also included for reference.

The 2019–20 European windstorm season was the fifth instance of seasonal European windstorm naming in Europe. This is the first season in which the Netherlands meteorological authority took part, joining those of Ireland and the United Kingdom. It comprised a year from 1 September to 31 August, however names were announced six days into that year. The Portuguese, Spanish and French meteorological agencies again collaborated too, joined by the Belgian meteorological agency.

== Background and naming ==
In 2015, the Met Office and Met Éireann conducted or promoted the "Name our Storms" project for wind storms, going to the public for the suggestions. The meteorological offices produced a full list of names for 2015–16 through to 2017–18, common to both the UK and Ireland, with the Netherlands taking part from 2019 onwards. Names in the United Kingdom will be invoked under the National Severe Weather Warning system when a storm is forecast to merit an Amber ('be prepared') or Red ('take action (danger to life)') warning.

There are two main naming lists: one created by the national meteorological agencies of the United Kingdom, Ireland and the Netherlands, and another created by the equivalent agencies from France, Spain, Portugal and Belgium. Additionally, former Atlantic hurricanes will retain their names as assigned by the National Hurricane Center of the United States.

=== United Kingdom, Ireland and the Netherlands ===
The following names have been selected for the 2019–2020 season:

- Atiyah
- Brendan
- Ciara
- Dennis
- Ellen
- Francis
- Gerda (unused)
- Hugh (unused)
- Iris (unused)
- Jan (unused)
- Kitty (unused)
- Liam (unused)
- Maura (unused)
- Noah (unused)
- Olivia (unused)
- Piet (unused)
- Róisín (unused)
- Samir (unused)
- Tara (unused)
- Vince (unused)
- Willow (unused)

=== France, Spain, Portugal and Belgium ===
This will be the third year in which the meteorological agencies of France, Spain and Portugal will be naming storms which affect their areas. This naming scheme is partially overlapping with that used by the United Kingdom, Ireland and the Netherlands, as storms named by the other group of agencies will be used reciprocally.

The following names have been selected for the 2019–2020 season:

- Amélie
- Bernardo
- Cecilia
- Daniel
- Elsa
- Fabien
- Gloria
- Hervé
- Inès
- Jorge
- Karine
- Leon
- Myriam
- Norberto
- Odette
- Prosper (unused)
- Raquel (unused)
- Simon (unused)
- Teresa (unused)
- Valentin (unused)
- Wanda (unused)

=== Other naming systems ===
Two former Atlantic systems (One of them being a hurricane and the other being a tropical storm) transitioned into a European windstorm and retained its name as assigned by the National Hurricane Center in Miami, Florida:

- Lorenzo
- Sebastien
- Edouard

Besides these naming systems, the Free University of Berlin also names high and low pressure areas through its "Adopt a vortex" programme. The Nordic nations of Denmark, Norway and Sweden also name storms with more limited reciprocation. Other nations may also name storms either through their national meteorological institutions or popularly.

== Season summary ==
The first system of the season was Storm Lorenzo, when Met Éireann issued yellow wind warnings for Ireland and an orange warning for the western coastal counties. The storm consisted of the remnants of Hurricane Lorenzo, which had turned extratropical. The next named system was Amélie, named by Météo-France on 1 November. Storm Bernardo was named next, by the Spanish meteorological agency, AEMET. This system primarily affected the Balearic Islands. Cecilia was named next by AEMET, when the agency warned of rain and wind on the Iberian Peninsula and the Balearic Islands.

On 6 December, the Irish meteorological agency named Atiyah, the first system to receive its name from the Irish, British and Dutch storm naming list. After Atiyah passed, storms Daniel, Elsa and Fabien were named in quick succession on 15, 16 and 18 December, respectively. Storms Brendan and Gloria were next to be named by Met Éireann and AEMET, respectively, after a quiet start to January 2020. Hervé was named by Météo-France on 3 February, after the agency expected wind gusts of up to 140 km/h (87 mph; 76 kn) at Corsica's coast. A few days later, on 5 February, Ciara was named by Met Office, warning of heavy rain and gales throughout the United Kingdom.

Following Ciara, Dennis was named by the Met Office on 11 February 2020. The agency warned of heavy rain and gales across the United Kingdom. A day later, Inès was named by the French meteorological agency. The agency warned of wind speeds up to 130 km/h (81 mph; 70 kn) in the northern part of France on 13 February. The Spanish meteorological agency named Jorge next, warning of seas 4 to 5 m (13 to 16 ft) high on 29 February through 2 March and snow around 1,000 m (3,300 ft). Following Jorge, Karine, Leon, Myriam and Norberto were named in quick succession, on 29 February, 1, 3 and 5 March, respectively. Karine was named by AEMET, while Leon, Myriam and Norberto were named by Météo-France.

== Storms ==
=== Storm Lorenzo ===
Storm Lorenzo
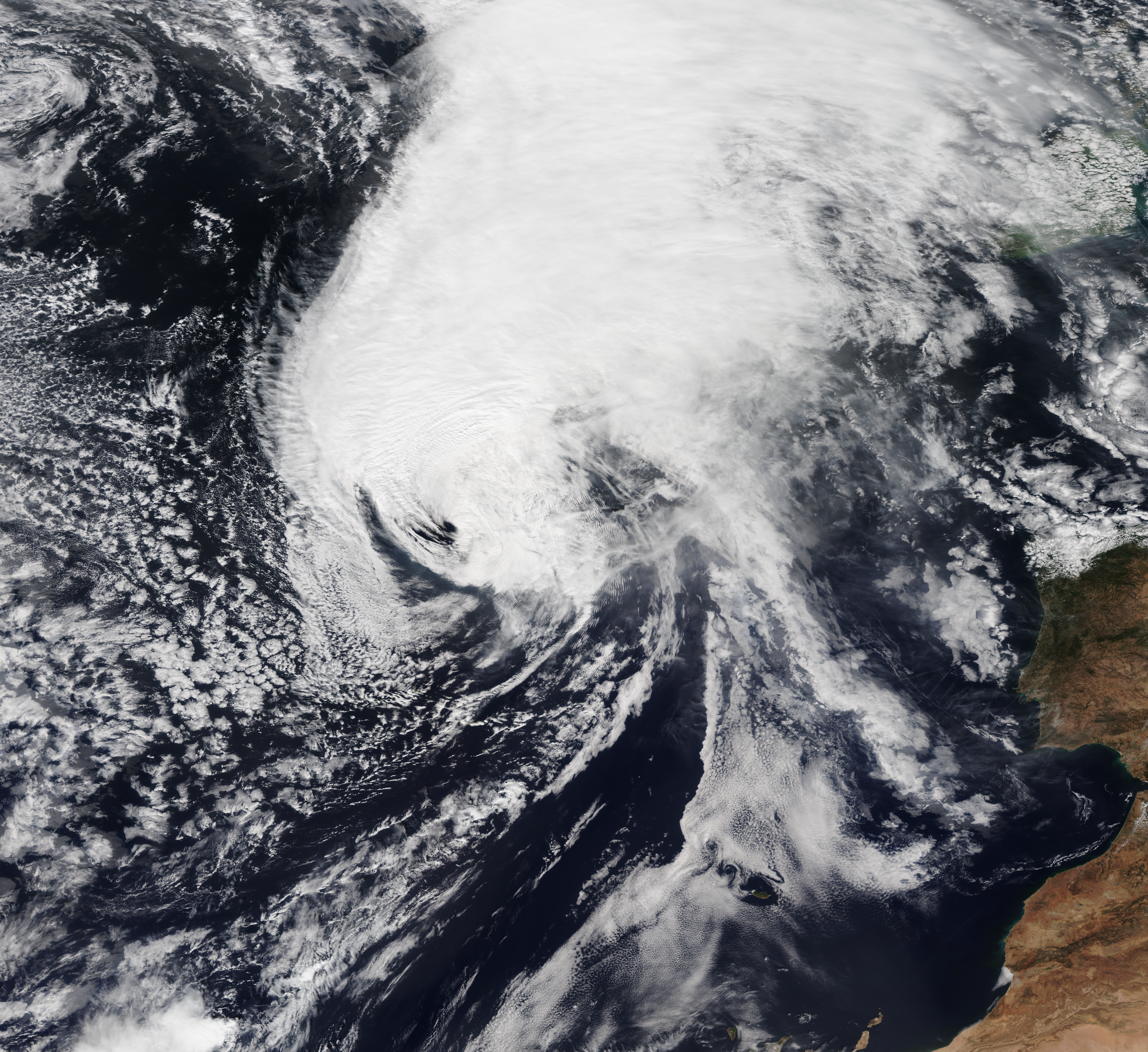
- Storm Lorenzo after passing through the Azores on 2 October

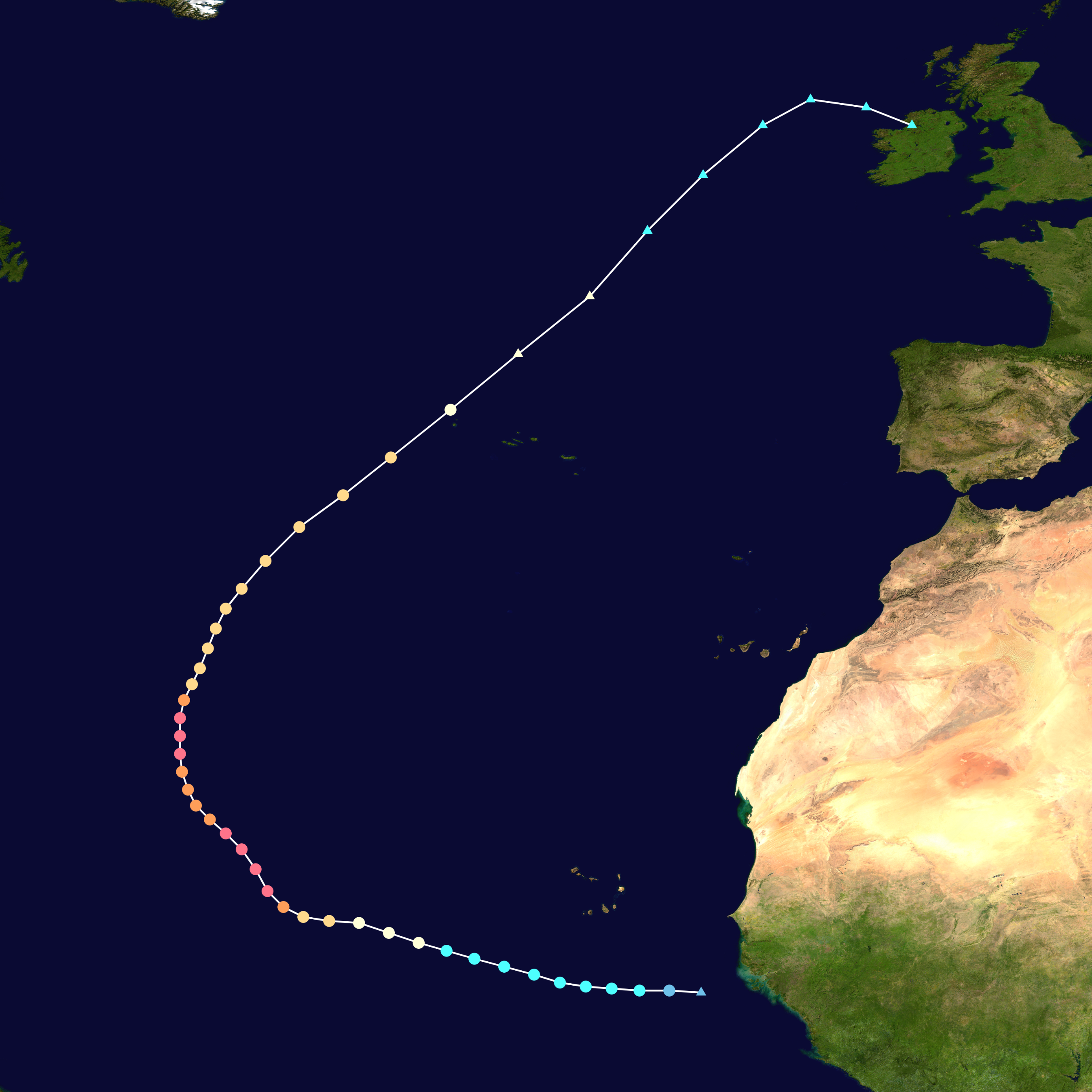
- Track and intensity of Lorenzo at six-hour intervals according to the NHC and OPC
- Area affected: Azores, Ireland, United Kingdom
- Date of impact: 2 October – 7 October
- Maximum wind gust: 107 km/h (66 mph; 58 kn)
- Lowest pressure: 966 mbar (28.5 inHg)
- Fatalities: 20
- Power outages: 20,000
- Damage: £285 million (€340 million)

The National Hurricane Center in Miami, Florida began monitoring a tropical wave emerging from the west coast of Africa on 19 September, which subsequently developed into Hurricane Lorenzo by 25 September. The system continued to intensify, ultimately becoming the easternmost Category 5 hurricane on record in the Atlantic Ocean. On 26 September, the Instituto Português do Mar e da Atmosfera (IPMA) began issuing advisories for Hurricane Lorenzo. The National Hurricane Center issued hurricane and tropical storm watches on 30 September for the Azores, which were later upgraded to warnings.

Lorenzo began undergoing extratropical transition on 2 October, while passing over the Azores a few hours before the National Hurricane Center issued their 09:00 UTC advisory. The subsequent (and final) advisory stated that Lorenzo had become a post-tropical cyclone, which was subsequently named Storm Lorenzo by Met Éireann as they issued a yellow warning of wind for the entirety of Ireland, as well as an orange warning for the western coastal counties. The Met Office issued yellow wind warnings for Northern Ireland, Cornwall and parts of Devon and south-west Wales.

On 3 October, the M6 Buoy, located about 400 km (250 mi) west of Mace Head, County Galway, recorded a pressure of 969 mbar (28.6 inHg) near Lorenzo's centre. The same buoy also recorded a maximum wave height of 12.5 m (41 ft). On 4 October, while the storm was passing across Ireland, new weather warnings were issued for the counties of Clare, Galway, Longford, Mayo, Roscommon and Westmeath. The highest recorded wind gust was 107 km/h (66 mph), with the highest 10-minute mean at 87 km/h (54 mph), both recorded at Mace Head.

Storm Lorenzo continued to weaken as it moved away from Ireland into the Irish Sea, with the United States-based Ocean Prediction Center ceasing to monitor Lorenzo on 4 October after it crossed the United Kingdom. Now little more than a weak frontal zone, Storm Lorenzo made landfall in northern Germany on 5 October, subsequently moving over eastern Europe the following day before dissipating on 7 October while moving into Russia.

Power was cut to almost 20,000 homes in Ireland at the height of the storm, with flooding occurring throughout the country. The River Eske partially flooded Donegal as result of nearly 50 mm (2.0 in) of rain falling as high tide was approaching. The amount of damage country-wide, however, was less than anticipated. The storm's only known fatality while it was extratropical occurred when a tree fell on a person in Stafford. However, Lorenzo had been responsible for nineteen further fatalities, including seven crew members of the capsized French cargo ship Bourbon Rhode who were never found. During its combined lifespan as a major hurricane and a European windstorm, Lorenzo caused at least £285 million (€340 million) in damage.

=== Storm Amélie (Arne) ===
Storm Amélie
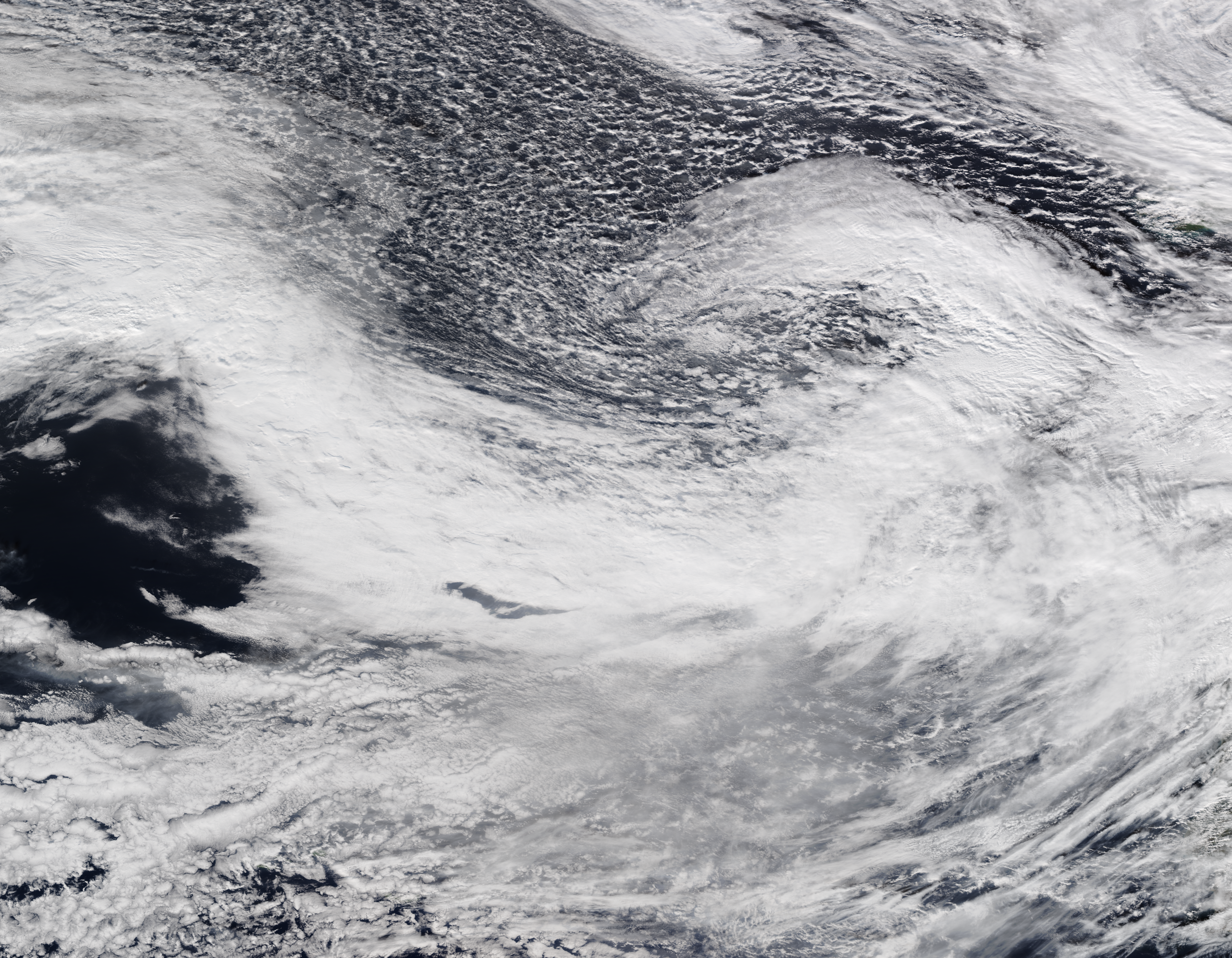
- Amélie over the Atlantic Ocean, 2 November

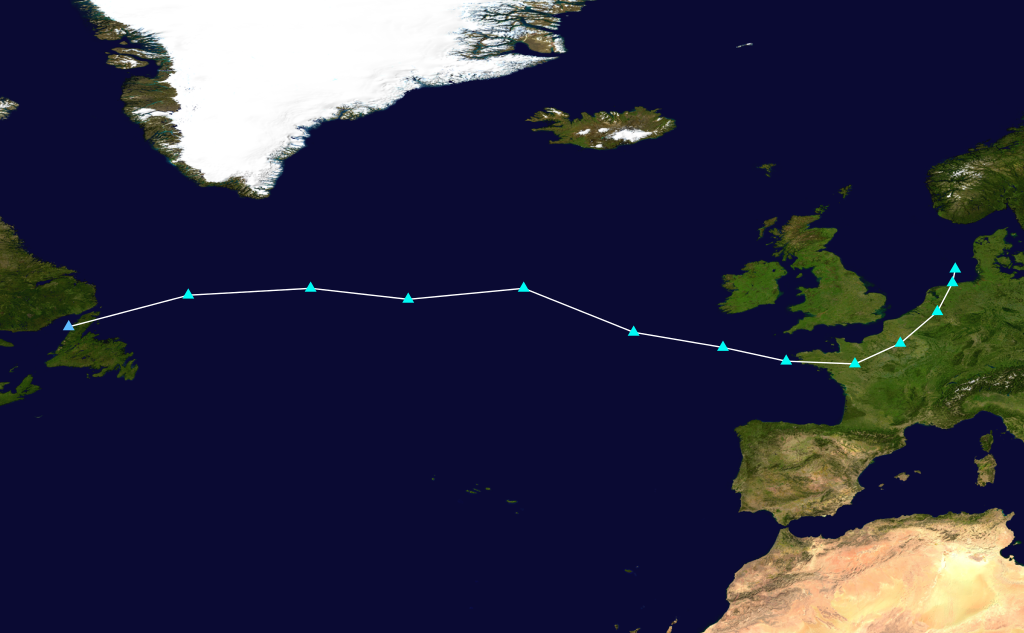
- Track and intensity of Storm Amélie at six-hour intervals according to the OPC
- Area affected: France, Spain, Italy
- Date of impact: 31 October – 9 November
- Maximum wind gust: 189 km/h (117 mph; 102 kn)
- Lowest pressure: 972 mbar (28.7 inHg)
- Fatalities: 1
- Power outages: 140,000
- Damage: £110 million (€120 million)

The low-pressure system that would later become Amélie was first noted on 31 October between Canada and Greenland over the Labrador Sea. After emerging into the open Atlantic, the system was named Storm Amélie by Météo-France on 1 November. The French meteorological agency expected wind gusts up to and possibly surpassing 160 km/h (99 mph; 86 kn) locally at the western coast at the time of naming the storm.

Storm Amélie underwent explosive cyclogenesis on 2 November while located over the open north Atlantic, reaching a minimum central pressure of 972 mbar (28.7 inHg). Amélie subsequently made landfall on Brittany's Atlantic coast in the early hours of 3 November, bringing wind gusts of to 163 km/h (101 mph; 88 kn) at Cap Ferret. Amélie also brought wind gusts up to 170 km/h (110 mph; 92 kn) along the northern coast of Spain, including a record-setting 130 km/h (81 mph; 70 kn) gust for Santander Airport. The highest wind gust recorded from Amélie was at Cagnano in Haute-Corse on Corsica, reaching 189 km/h (117 mph; 102 kn).

Besides causing numerous fallen trees and power outages for 140,000 properties, Amélie also triggered a landslide in Nice in the south of France, resulting in the only known fatality from the storm. The SNCF temporarily closed a TGV line between Hendaye and Bordeaux due to debris on the tracks, causing some 2,000 passengers to be stranded for up to 15 hours. Damage from Amélie across France, Italy and Spain totalled more than £110 million (€120 million).

After the centre of Amélie moved inland over northern France, it gradually tracked eastwards and then north-eastwards. Amélie passed over Belgium and the Netherlands on 3 November and then over Germany on 4 November, while steadily weakening. After crossing Poland on 5 November as a weak frontal boundary, Amélie stalled over the Baltic states on 6 November, before being absorbed by an approaching warm front over Estonia on 9 November.

=== Storm Bernardo (Detlef) ===
Storm Bernardo
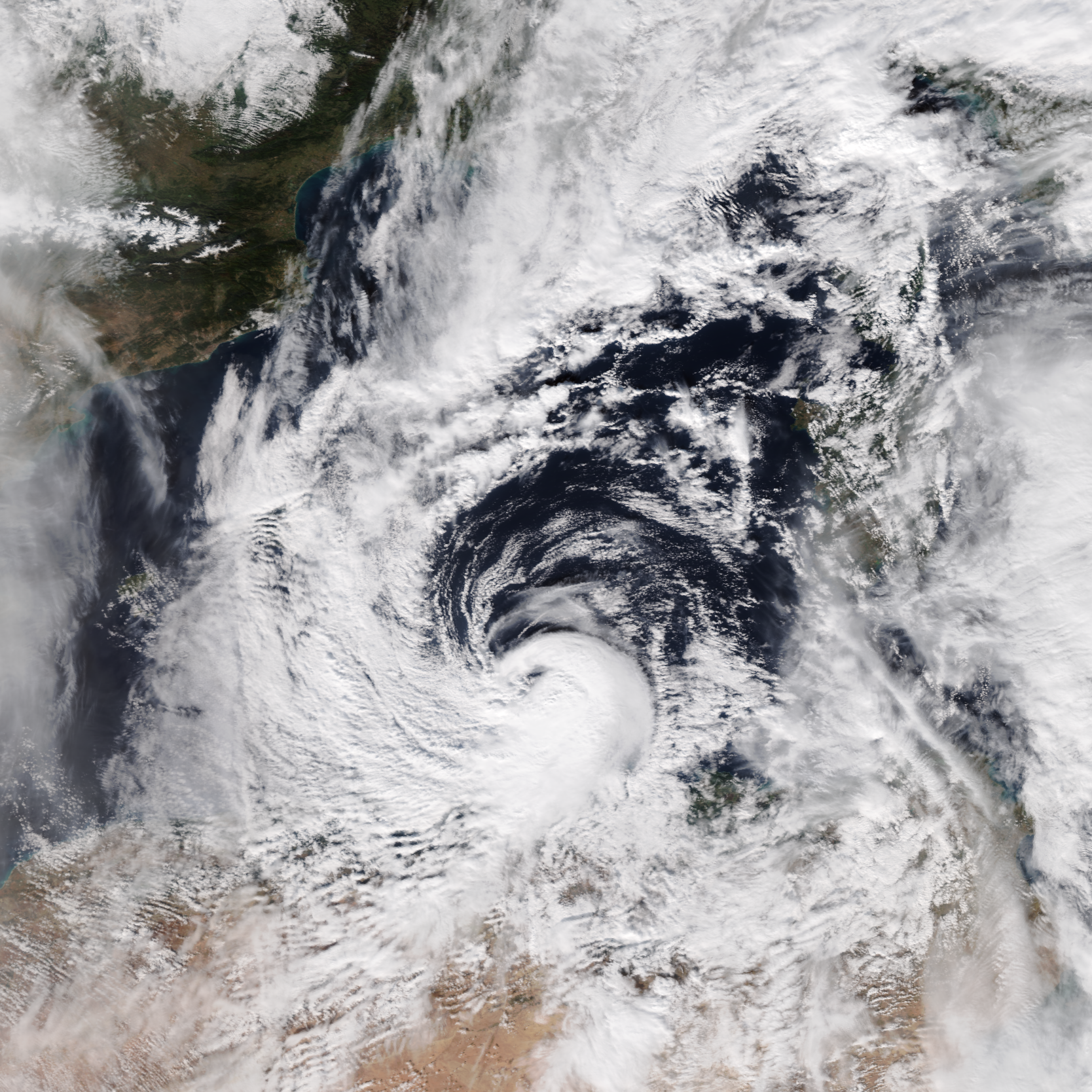
- Bernardo just offshore of Algeria on 11 November

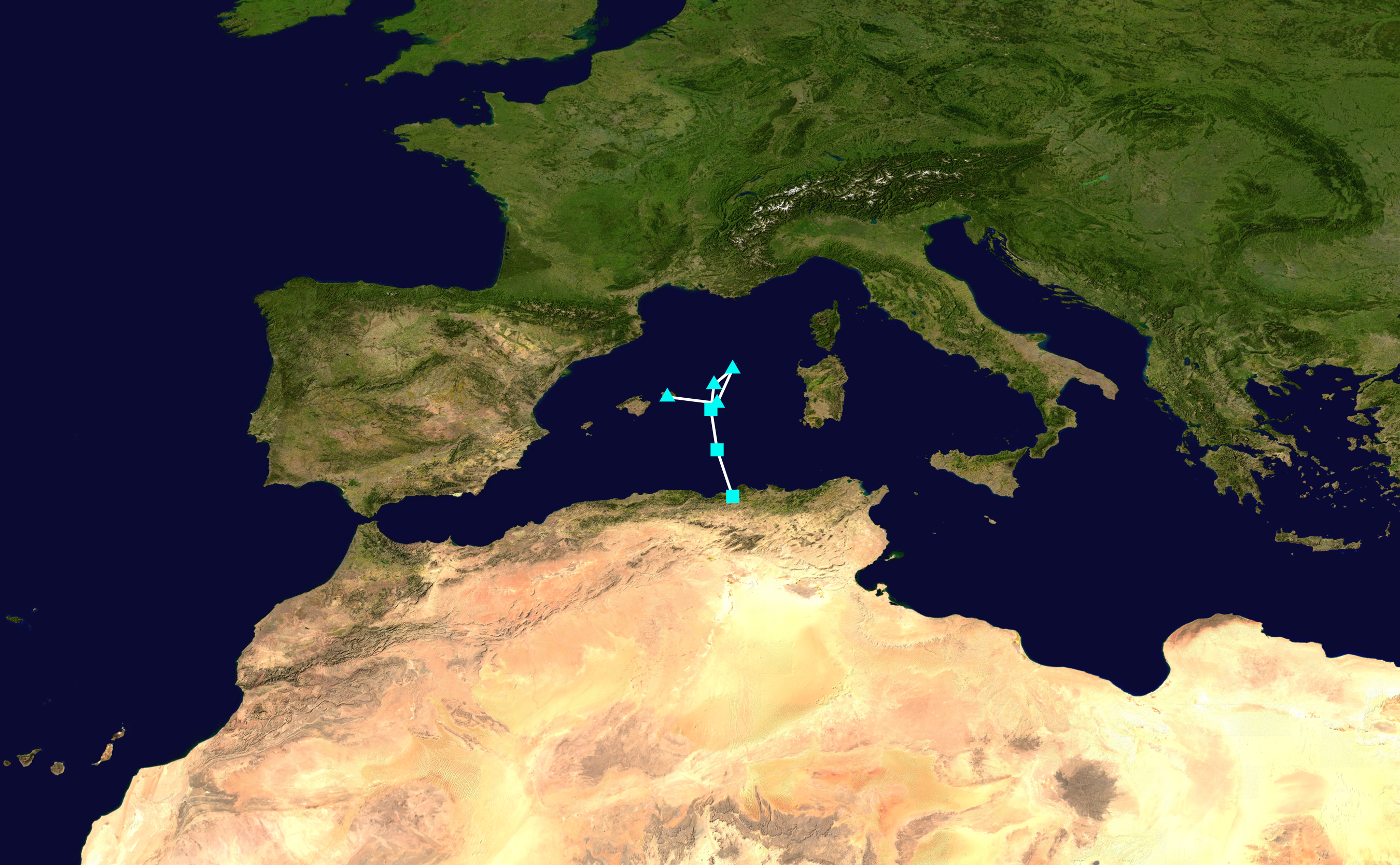
- Track and intensity of Storm Bernardo at six-hour intervals according to the Met Office
- Area affected: Spain, Algeria, Italy
- Date of impact: 7 November – 18 November
- Maximum wind gust: 111 km/h (69 mph; 60 kn)
- Lowest pressure: 996 mbar (29.4 inHg)
- Fatalities: 1
- Damage: Minimal

The precursor to Storm Bernardo was first noted as a deep low over north-eastern Canada on 7 November. After considerably weakening and crossing the Atlantic without any notable impacts, the system was named Bernardo by the State Meteorological Agency of Spain (AEMET) on 9 November as it was approaching the Iberian Peninsula from the Bay of Biscay. Bernardo crossed northern Spain and emerged into the Mediterranean Sea, affecting the Balearic Islands on 10 November with wind gusts of up to 111 km/h (69 mph; 60 kn) recorded in the Alfabia Mountains along the north-west coast of Mallorca. On 11 November, Bernardo strengthened to its peak intensity of 996 mbar (29.4 inHg) and formed an eye-like feature, leading several media outlets to report that the storm had medicane-like characteristics. However, AEMET did not confirm that the storm had reached medicane status.

After losing its brief eye-like feature, Bernardo followed the coast of Algeria, remaining closely offshore as it moved eastwards across the Mediterranean before stalling over southern Italy for two days. Bernardo then accelerated to the north-east as a weak frontal boundary, moving over the Baltic states on 14 November and into northern Russia on 15 November. After briefly reintensifying and then weakening once more, Bernardo was last noted as a weak low over Siberia on 18 November.

When first issuing warnings for Storm Bernardo, AEMET expected wave heights of up to 6 m (20 ft) around the Balearic Islands and along the coast of several Spanish provinces bordering the Bay of Biscay. They also forecasted precipitation up to 20 cm (7.9 in) in the form of snow over the Cantabrian Mountains above 1,000 m (3,300 ft), and rainfall up to 50 mm (2.0 in) within 12 hours in the provinces of Cantabria, Navarra, Basque Country and Asturias. In Asturias, the regional meteorological agency warned of the risk of avalanches due to snow accumulation. Wind gusts were forecasted to reach up to 110 km/h (68 mph; 59 kn). However, impacts from Bernardo were ultimately minimal. A fallen tree in Mallorca caused the only known fatality from the storm, and little damage was reported along its track.

=== Storm Cecilia (Luis) ===
Storm Cecilia
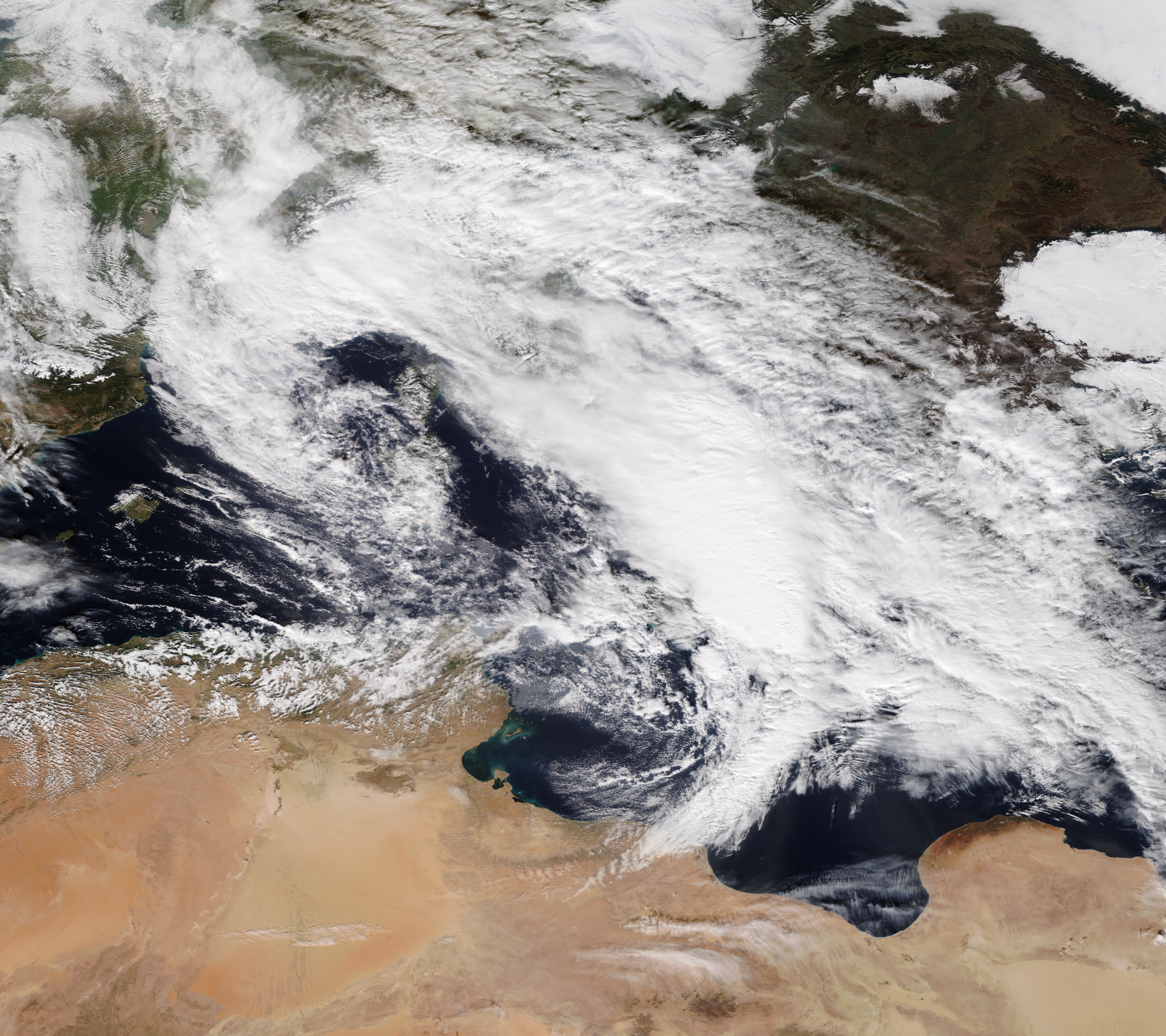
- Storm Cecilia approaching Italy on 24 November

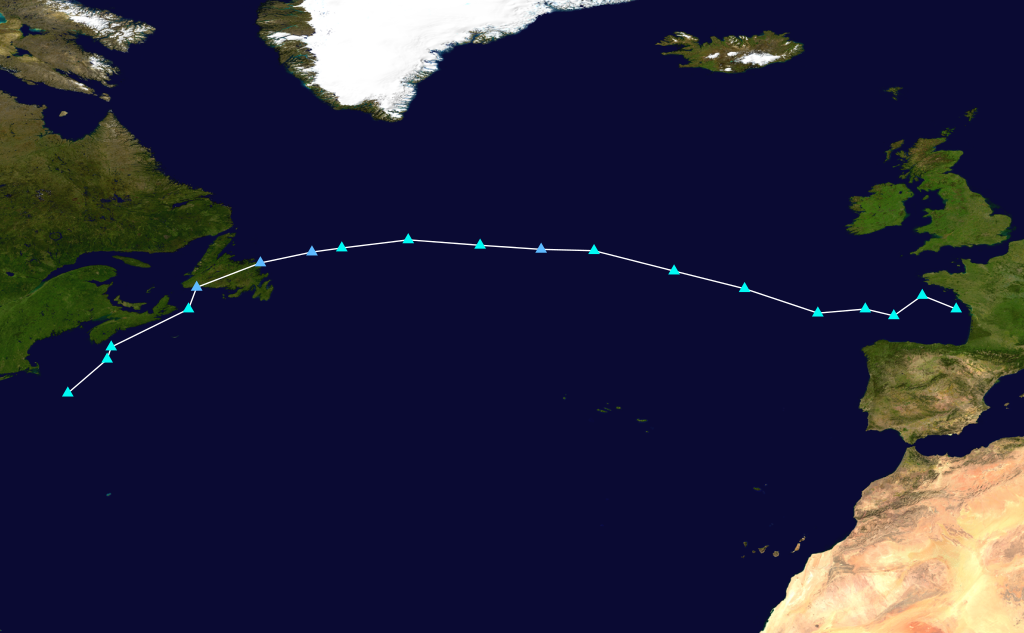
- Track and intensity of Storm Cecilia at six-hour intervals according to the OPC
- Area affected: Spain
- Date of impact: 16 November – 29 November
- Maximum wind gust: 163 km/h (101 mph; 88 kn)
- Lowest pressure: 974 mbar (28.8 inHg)
- Fatalities: 0
- Damage: Minimal

The precursor to Storm Cecila was first noted as a developing low between the Carolinas and Bermuda on 16 November. It subsequently deepened and slowly moved north-eastwards parallel to the East Coast of the United States, before crossing Newfoundland and emerging into the open Atlantic by 21 November. At this point, the system was named Cecilia by the State Meteorological Agency of Spain (AEMET), who issued warnings for rain and wind impacts across the Iberian Peninsula and on the Balearic Islands. Weather warnings were also issued in southern and coastal western France.

Cecila intensified as it crossed the Atlantic and reached its peak intensity of 974 mbar (28.8 inHg) in the Bay of Biscay on 23 November before making landfall in northern Spain. Along the coast, wind gusts of up to 163 km/h (101 mph; 88 kn) were recorded at Cap Machichaco in Biscay province. During the storm, a chemical transport ship ran aground at the Galician coast. However, overall impacts were minimal across Spain.

Cecilia weakened as it crossed the Iberian Peninsula and emerged into the Mediterranean Sea, crossing Italy as a weak frontal system on 25 November. Continuing slowly eastwards, Cecilia was last noted over the Black Sea on 28 November before being absorbed by Storm Sebastien over southern Ukraine on 29 November.

=== Storm Sebastien ===
Storm Sebastien
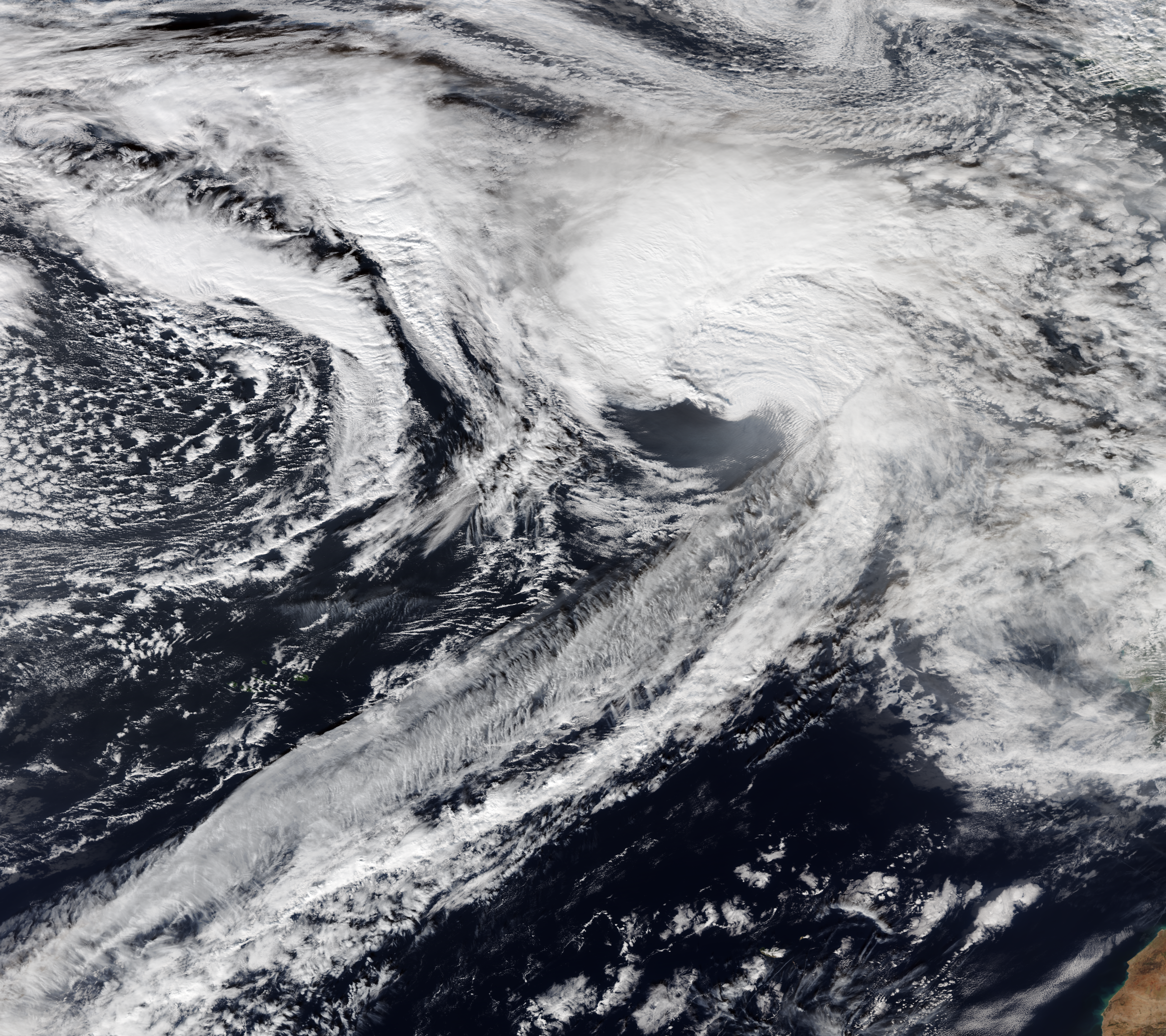
- Sebastien re-intensifying after completing its extratropical transition on 25 November

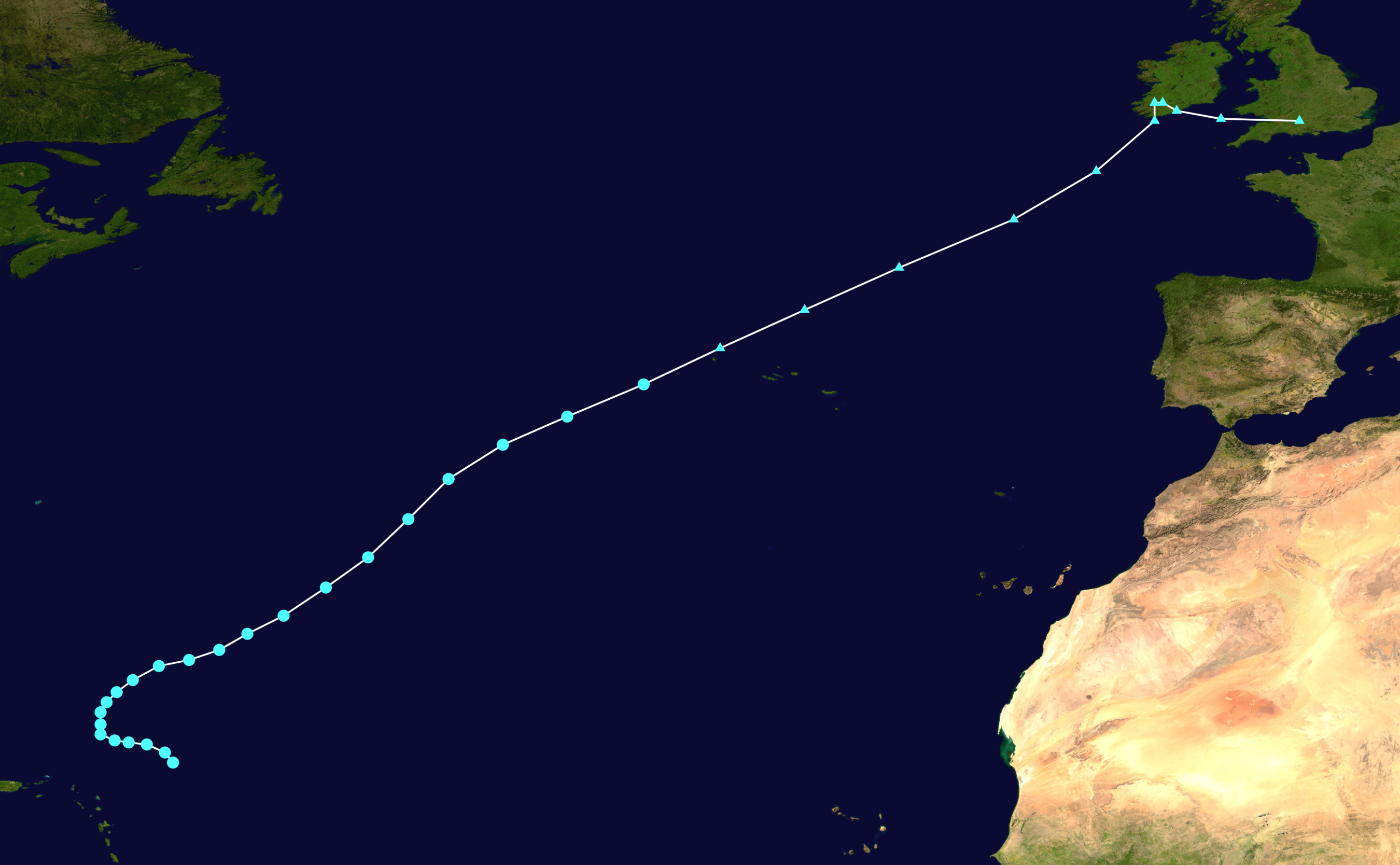
- Track and intensity of Sebastien at six-hour intervals according to the NHC and OPC
- Area affected: Ireland, United Kingdom
- Date of impact: 24 November – 1 December
- Maximum wind gust: 80 km/h (50 mph; 43 kn)
- Lowest pressure: 980 mbar (29 inHg)
- Fatalities: 0
- Damage: Minimal

A large area of disturbed weather persisted over the central subtropical Atlantic in mid-November. On 19 November, this area of thunderstorm activity developed sufficiently to be designated Tropical Storm Sebastien by the National Hurricane Center in Miami, Florida. After several days of slow movement, Sebastien accelerated towards the north-east and began slowly losing tropical characteristics. The system completed its extratropical transition late on 24 November, becoming extratropical Storm Sebastien in the process.

After becoming extratropical, Storm Sebastien began to re-intensify as it was now situated in a favourable baroclinic environment. Shortly before landfall on the south coast of Ireland on 26 November, Sebastien reached its peak intensity of around 980 mbar (29 inHg). Sebastien maintained this intensity for around two days as it crossed Ireland and the United Kingdom and entered the North Sea, before slowly weakening as it made landfall in Denmark on 29 November. Around this time, Sebastien absorbed the remnants of Storm Cecilia to its south-east. Sebastien continued to weaken as it accelerated north-eastwards into European Russia, finally being absorbed by a larger low-pressure system to its north by 1 December.

Heavy rainfall was the primary threat from Storm Sebastien. As the storm approached the United Kingdom, the Met Office issued yellow weather warnings for heavy rainfall in Northern England, South West England and South Wales. Many of these areas had already been impacted by ongoing flooding, and the Environment Agency issued seven "danger to life" flood warnings in Yorkshire and 60 flood alerts across England and Wales as a result. Storm surge flooding coinciding with high spring tides and high coastal winds of up to 80 km/h (50 mph; 43 kn) presented additional hazards, with waves forecasted to reach up to 6.7 m (22 ft).

Across southern England, up to 60 mm (2.4 in) of rain was recorded as Sebastien made landfall on 27 November. However, impacts from Storm Sebastien were ultimately less severe than anticipated. Heavy rainfall and thunderstorms caused disruption in the London area. Flooding and wind damage was reported on the Isle of Wight. Minor coastal flooding was also reported in the Fareham area, although far less severe than had been forecasted.

=== Storm Atiyah (Rudi) ===
Storm Atiyah
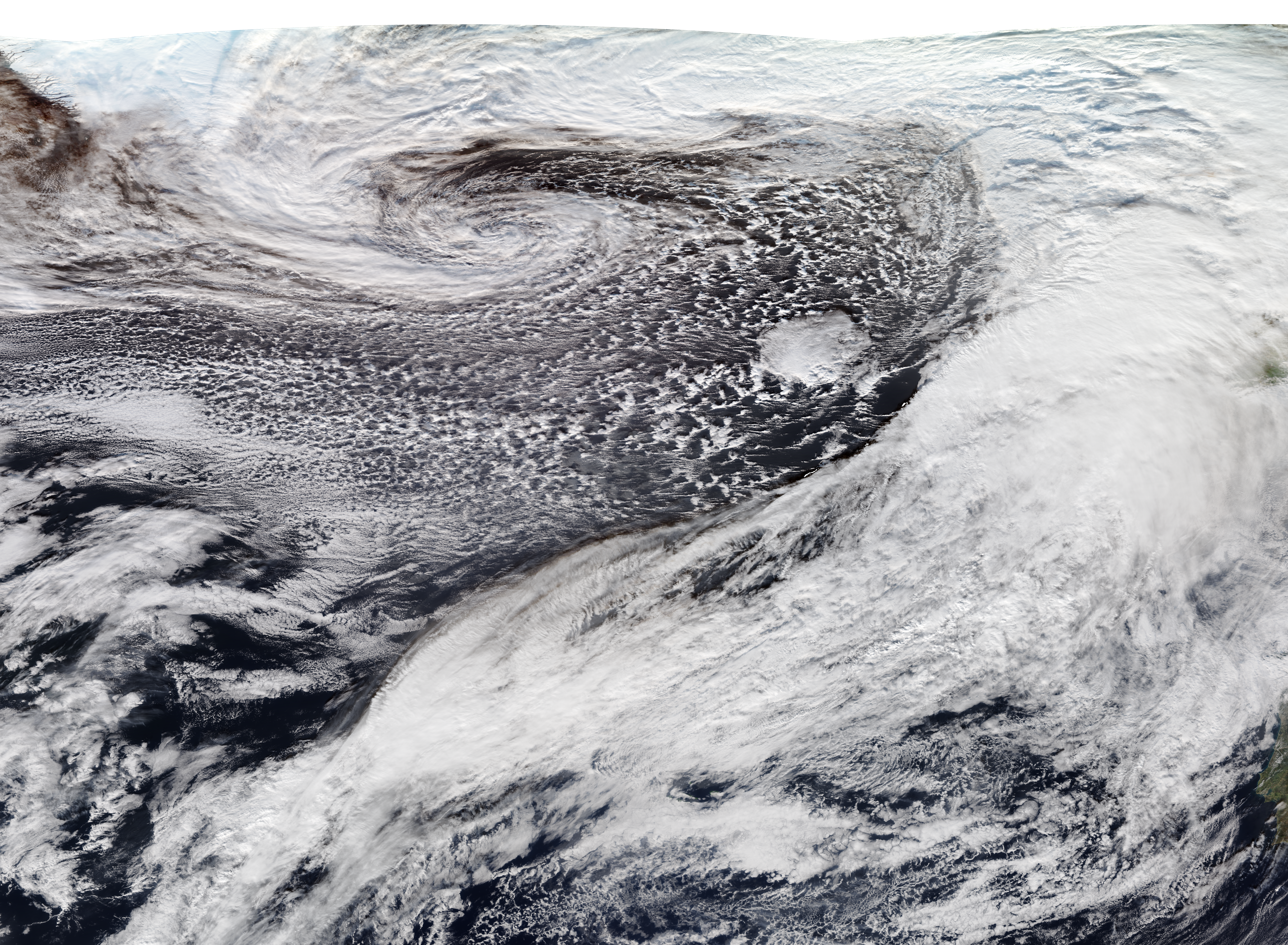
- Atiyah developing over the far north Atlantic on 7 December

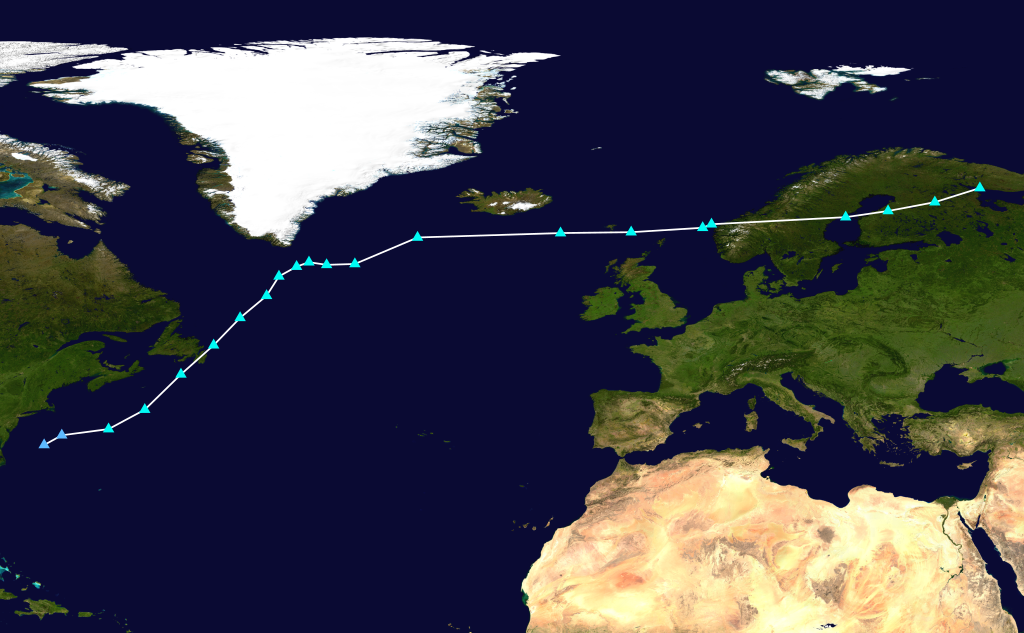
- Track and intensity of Atiyah at six-hour intervals according to the Met Office and OPC
- Area affected: Ireland, United Kingdom, Netherlands, France
- Date of impact: 5 December – 13 December
- Maximum wind gust: 150.1 km/h (93.3 mph; 81.0 kn)
- Lowest pressure: 956 mbar (28.2 inHg)
- Fatalities: 0
- Power outages: 34,000
- Damage: £40 million (€44 million)

A low was first noted to be developing off the coast of New England by the Ocean Prediction Center on 5 December. The following day, as the low continued to develop and move eastwards across the far north Atlantic, Met Éireann named the system Atiyah and issued orange wind warnings for the western counties of Ireland and yellow warnings for the remainder of the country. At that time, the agency expected mean wind speeds of 65 to 80 km/h (40 to 50 mph; 35 to 43 kn) and gusts of up to 130 km/h (81 mph; 70 kn) on 8 December across Ireland. On 8 December, a red weather warning was issued for County Kerry due to the increasing risk of high wind impacts.

The centre of Storm Atiyah passed just to the north of Scotland on 8 December at its peak intensity of 956 mbar (28.2 inHg). High winds were recorded across the United Kingdom and Ireland, cutting power to 34,000 homes, downing trees and causing disruption throughout both countries. The highest recorded wind gust in the United Kingdom was on The Needles Old Battery, at 83 mph (134 km/h; 72 kn). The Kernow Weather Team recorded an unofficial wind gust of 96 mph (154 km/h; 83 kn) in Illogan, Cornwall, although this gust wasn't recorded at an official Met Office station.

As Atiyah moved eastwards away from Scotland into the Norwegian Sea, a strong pressure gradient existed between the centre of the storm and an area of high pressure centred over the Alps which brought high winds to the Netherlands on 8 and 9 December, with gusts of around 90 to 100 km/h (56 to 62 mph; 49 to 54 kn) and heavy showers sweeping across the country. Météo-France recorded the highest confirmed wind gust related to Atiyah of 150.1 km/h (93.3 mph; 81.0 kn), recorded at Cap Bear in Pyrénées-Orientales, France.

After widespread impacts across western Europe, Atiyah continued to move away from the region, making landfall in northern Norway on 10 December. Atiyah weakened rapidly as it continued eastwards, and it was last noted as a weak frontal system over Siberia on 13 December. Throughout its lifespan, Atiyah caused at least £40 million (€44 million) in damage.

=== Storm Daniel (Xander) ===
Storm Daniel
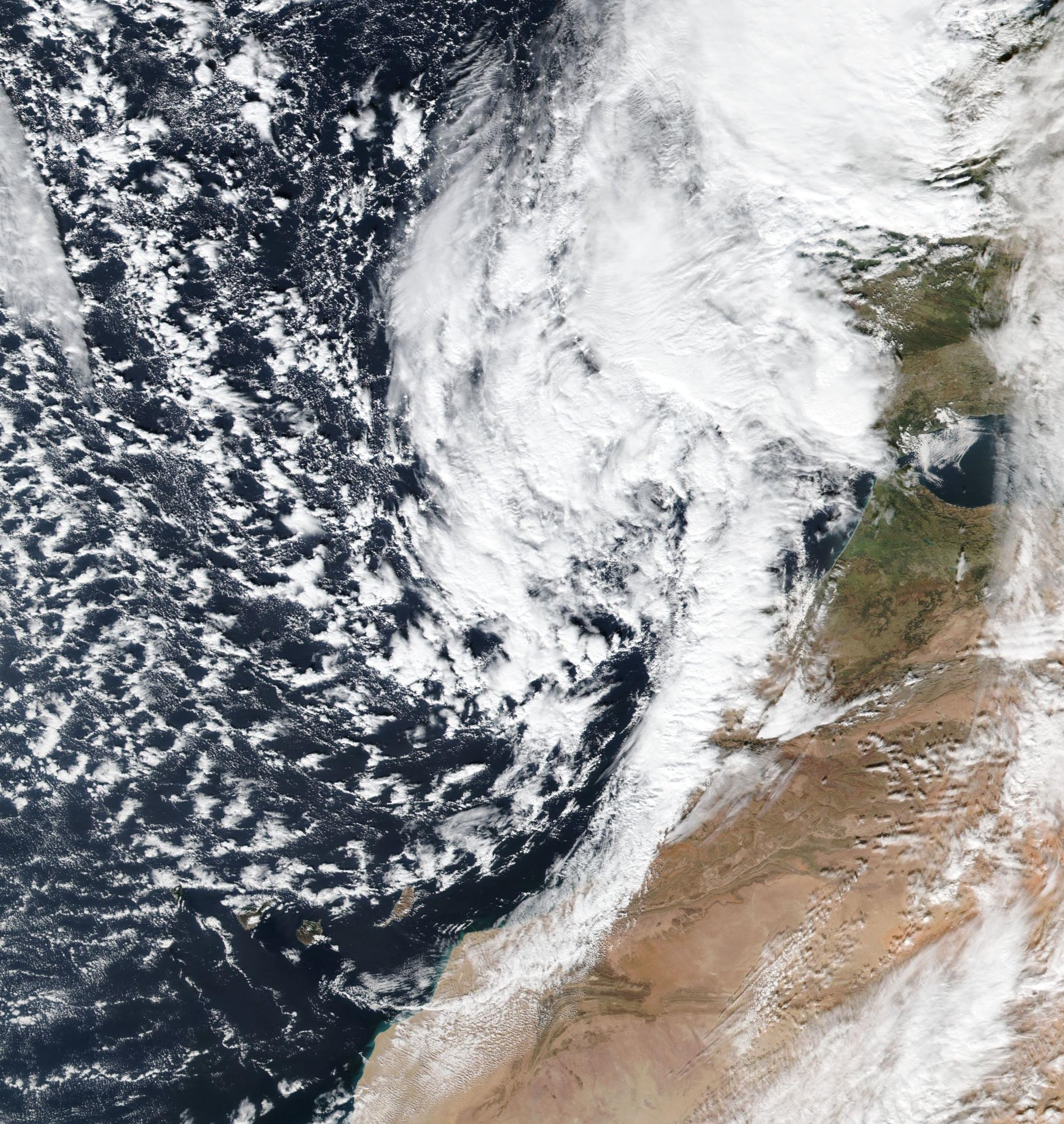
- Daniel approaching the Iberian Peninsula on 16 December

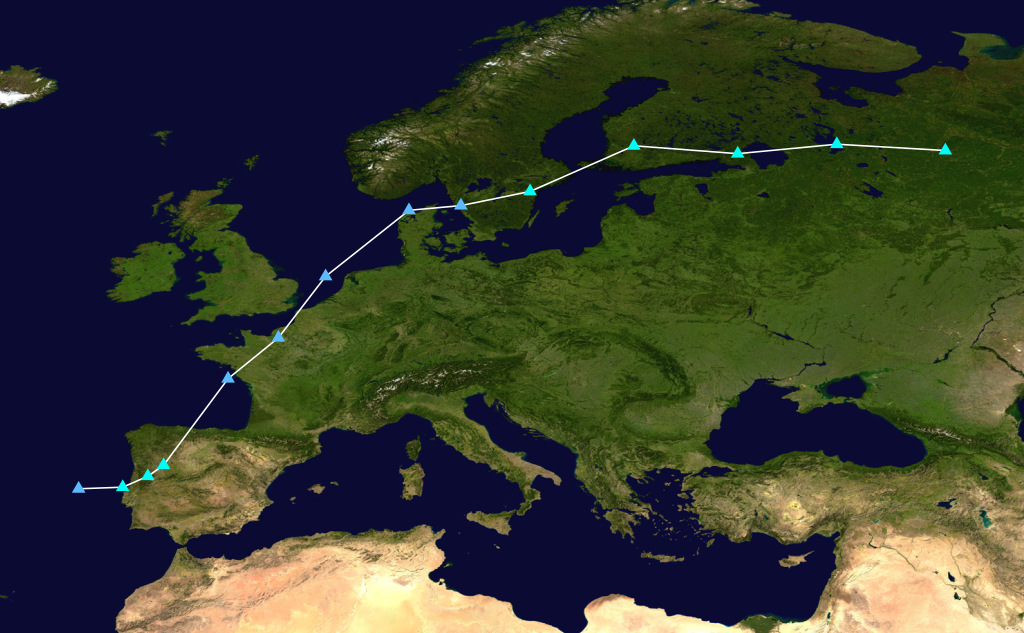
- Track and intensity of Daniel at six-hour intervals according to the Met Office and OPC
- Area affected: Iberian Peninsula
- Date of impact: 15 December – 21 December
- Maximum wind gust: 135 km/h (84 mph; 73 kn)
- Lowest pressure: 982 mbar (29.0 inHg)
- Fatalities: 0
- Damage: Minimal

Storm Daniel developed as a weak disturbance along a cold front a short distance offshore of Portugal on 15 December, and it was officially named by the State Meteorological Agency of Spain (AEMET) later that day. The agency issued an orange warning for Asturias, citing possible wave heights of 5 to 6 m (16 to 20 ft) at the coast. The agency further warned for wave heights of up to 7 m (23 ft) around the Canary Islands, heavy snowfall over high ground, and winds gusting to over 120 km/h (75 mph; 65 kn).

After making landfall in Portugal, Storm Daniel moved north-eastwards across the Iberian Peninsula into the Bay of Biscay, making a second landfall in southern Brittany, France as a weak trough on 17 December. Accelerating north-eastwards across Benelux and Denmark, Daniel began to slowly intensify, reaching its peak intensity of 982 mbar (29.0 inHg) over southern Finland on 19 December. Daniel subsequently began to weaken and unravel as a coherent system, dissipating over western Russia by 21 December.

During the passage of Storm Daniel, the use of snow chains on car tyres became necessary to navigate sections of the N-630 road in central Spain, while the Puerto de Pajares mountain pass was closed to trucks, articulated vehicles and buses due to blizzard conditions. The strongest wind gust from Storm Daniel was measured at La Pinilla ski resort in Segovia, Spain, reaching 135 km/h (84 mph; 73 kn). 108.8 mm (4.28 in) of rain fell at Riaño, León during the passage of the storm. Overall, however, damage and disruption from Storm Daniel was minimal.

=== Storm Elsa (Yadid) ===
Storm Elsa
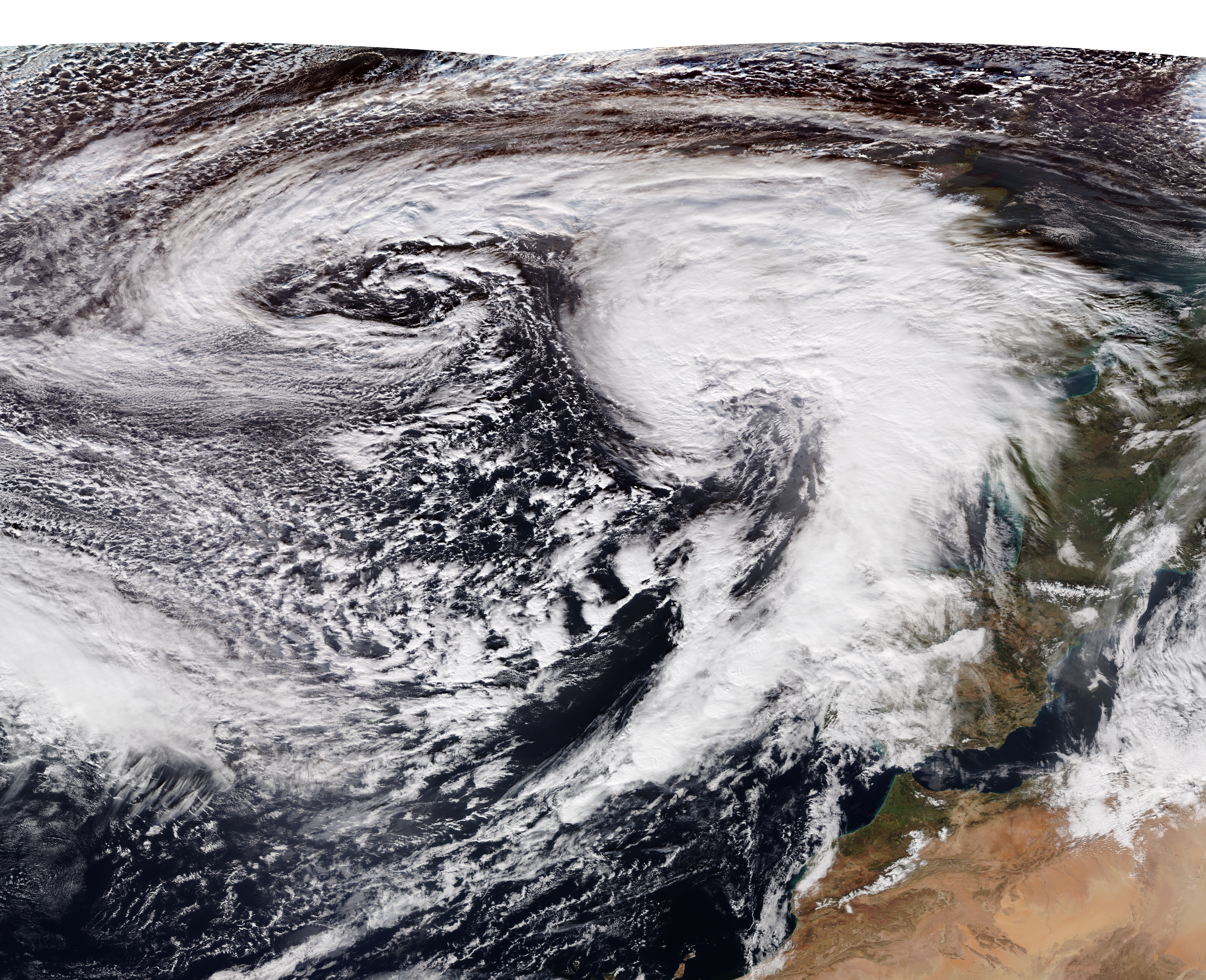
- Storm Elsa approaching Ireland on 18 December

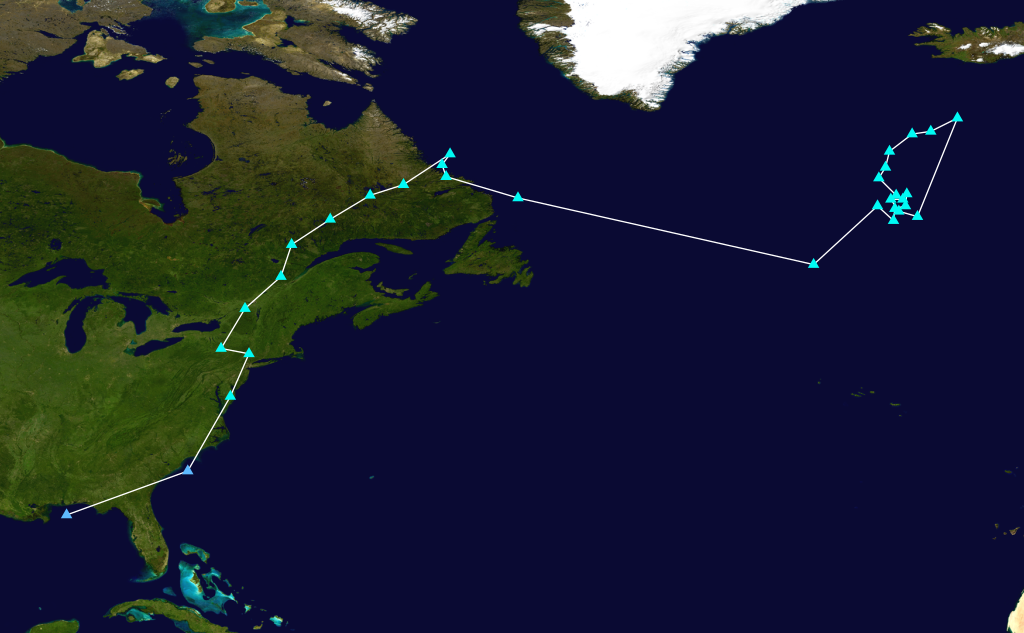
- Track and intensity of Storm Elsa at six-hour intervals according to the OPC
- Area affected: Portugal, Spain, France, United Kingdom, Ireland, Norway
- Date of impact: 13 December – 22 December
- Maximum wind gust: 168 km/h (104 mph; 91 kn)
- Lowest pressure: 961 mbar (28.4 inHg)
- Fatalities: 8
- Power outages: 140,000
- Damage: £74 million (€81 million)

Storm Elsa originated as an area of low pressure which formed over the Gulf of Mexico on 13 December and subsequently tracked gradually north-eastward, bottoming out at 961 mbar (28.4 inHg) along the coast of Canada on 16 December. At this time, the Instituto Português do Mar e da Atmosfera (IPMA) named the low Elsa. The same day, AEMET issued wind warnings for Spain relating to Storm Elsa with forecasted maximum wind speeds of 100 to 120 km/h (62 to 75 mph; 54 to 65 kn). After being named, Elsa moved away from Canada into the open Atlantic and stalled for four days to the west of the British Isles, fluctuating in intensity. On 21 December, Elsa finally began accelerating to the east ahead of Storm Fabien, which was approaching Elsa from the west. Elsa passed north of Scotland and made landfall in Norway before being absorbed by an unnamed secondary low, approaching from the south, by 22 December.

As Storm Elsa slowly approached, Met Éireann issued a nationwide yellow weather warning for Ireland, followed on 18 December by an upgrade to an orange warning for County Cork. The yellow warnings for counties Galway and Mayo were further upgraded to orange warnings at 20:00 local time that day, around an hour before the storm made its closest and most intense approach to Ireland. Severe flooding and extreme gusts were reported along the County Galway coastline. Close to 22:00, a storm surge breached the Promenade on Salthill in Galway City; over 50 cars were lost to the floodwaters. Besides the flooding, a ship ran aground after being forced onto coastal rocks by rough seas. Severe flooding was also reported in the Spanish Arch, Port of Galway, Oranmore and Kinvara areas of Galway. Gusts of up to 125 km/h (78 mph; 67 kn) were reported at the Mace Head weather station on the West Galway coast. Fallen trees were reported across the city and county, blocking numerous roads leading to Galway City. Around 22:30, Galway City Council activated its Emergency Response Plan and issued a notice warning people to stay indoors and to remain there unless it was of extreme importance. A similar warning was issued by Galway County Council. Members of the Gardaí, National Ambulance Service, Galway Fire Service and Civil Defence Ireland were deployed to Salthill and conducted searches on cars trapped in floodwaters.

Severe weather associated with Storm Elsa resulted in eight fatalities, primarily in southern Europe. The highest wind gust recorded during the storm was 168 km/h (104 mph; 91 kn), which was reached at Cerler-Cogulla in Province of Huesca, Spain. More than 140,000 properties lost electricity during the passage of the storm, and damage totals ultimately reached at least £74 million (€81 million). In the aftermath of Storm Elsa, Met Éireann's short notice of upgrading weather warnings around one hour before the storm hit the counties of Mayo and Galway was criticized. The agency defended their warnings, citing that "the nature of forecasting is that it is never certain [...]" and that they issue warnings when they see fit.

=== Storm Fabien (Ailton) ===
Storm Fabien
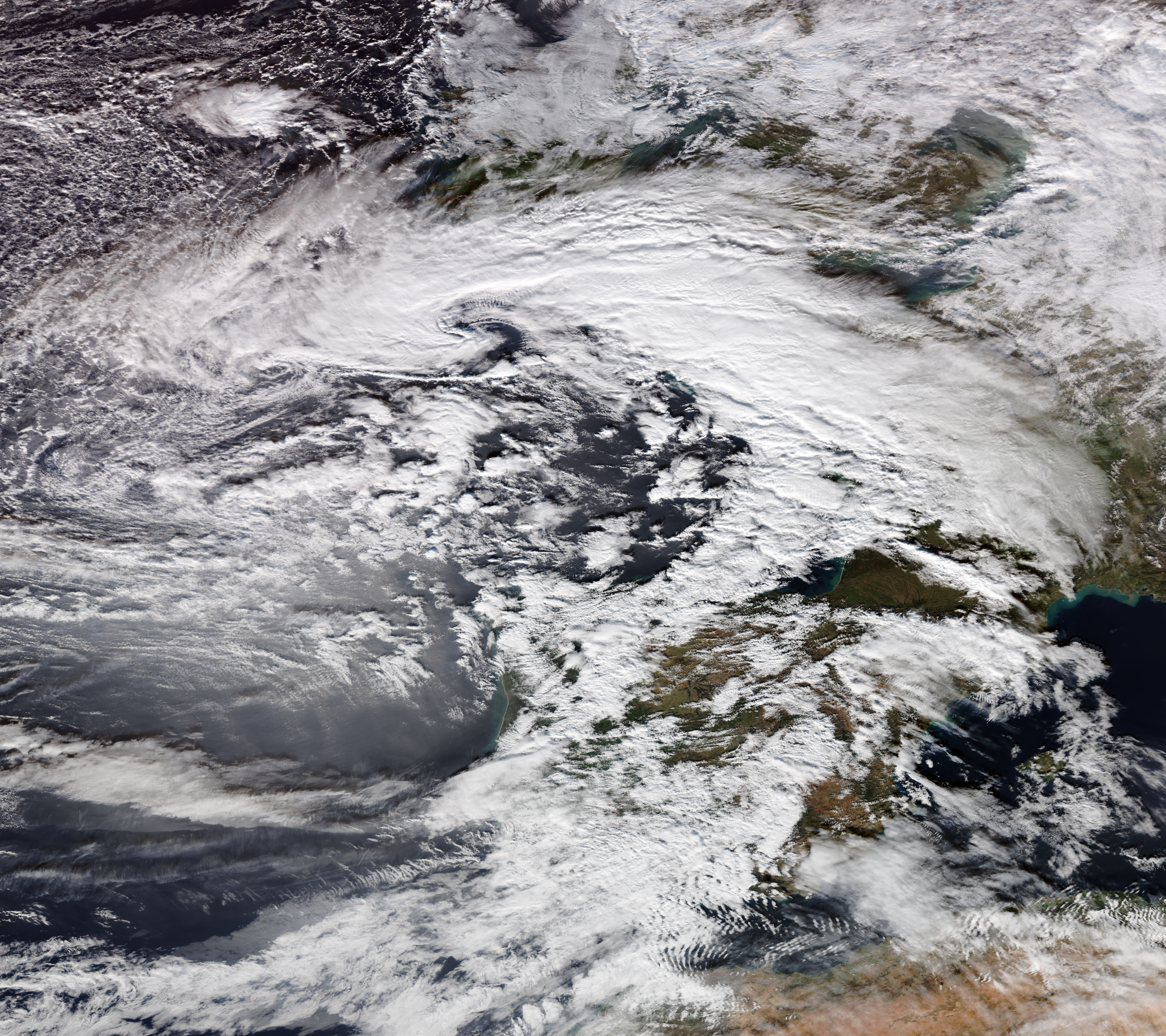
- Storm Fabien approaching northern France on 21 December

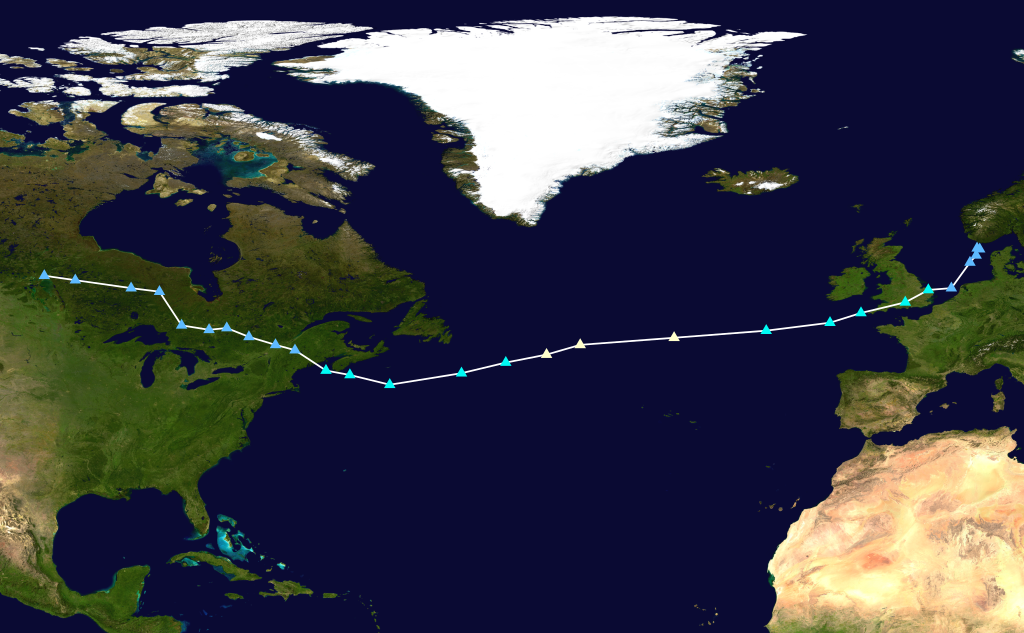
- Track and intensity of Storm Fabien at six-hour intervals according to the OPC
- Area affected: Portugal, Spain, France, United Kingdom
- Date of impact: 17 December – 29 December
- Maximum wind gust: 206 km/h (128 mph; 111 kn)
- Lowest pressure: 963 mbar (28.4 inHg)
- Fatalities: 0
- Power outages: 180,000
- Damage: £95 million (€100 million)

The system that would go on to become Storm Fabien formed as the easternmost of a series of weak lows which developed as disturbances along a stationary front situated across the southern United States on 17 December. The low broke free from this front and drifted northeastwards along the east coast of the United States, emerging into the Atlantic Ocean east of Newfoundland on 19 December. At that time, the State Meteorological Agency of Spain (AEMET) named the low Fabien, warning for wind speeds of 100 to 120 km/h (62 to 75 mph; 54 to 65 kn) and wave heights of 9 m (30 ft). Météo-France issued orange warnings for fifteen departments in the south-west of France.

Storm Fabien rapidly intensified as it crossed the Atlantic, its progress slightly slowed down by the presence of Storm Elsa which had already been situated almost stationary over the north Atlantic for several days prior to Fabien's formation. After initially pushing Elsa along ahead of itself, Fabien subsequently accelerated to the south of Elsa and reached its peak intensity of 963 mbar (28.4 inHg) while approaching landfall in South West England on 21 December. After crossing southern England, Fabien began to slow down and weaken, crossing over central Europe on 23 December before stalling for several days while centred over Cyprus as a weak trough along a stationary front from 24 December. After slowly drifting back northwards, Fabien made landfall on Ukraine's Black Sea coastline on 28 December, and dissipated shortly thereafter.

Despite the centre of Storm Fabien making landfall in southern England, the previous interaction with Storm Elsa to Fabien's north meant that the strongest winds were confined to the southern side of the storm, in particular across France. The SNCF canceled services in southwestern France as a result of high winds blowing trees onto railway tracks and around 100,000 households were left without power in the same region. On Corsica, a wind gust of 206 km/h (128 mph; 111 kn) was recorded, besides numerous fallen trees. All of the island's airports were closed and the ferry service between the island and the mainland was suspended as well. In Galicia, Spain, around 80,000 homes were left without power following the passage of Storm Fabien. A wind gust of 183.5 km/h (114.0 mph; 99.1 kn) was also recorded in Galicia. A train crashed into a fallen tree on the railway line between Vigo and Barcelona; no fatalities were reported. Along its path, damage from Storm Fabien totalled £95 million (€100 million).

=== Storm Brendan (Fenja) ===
Storm Brendan
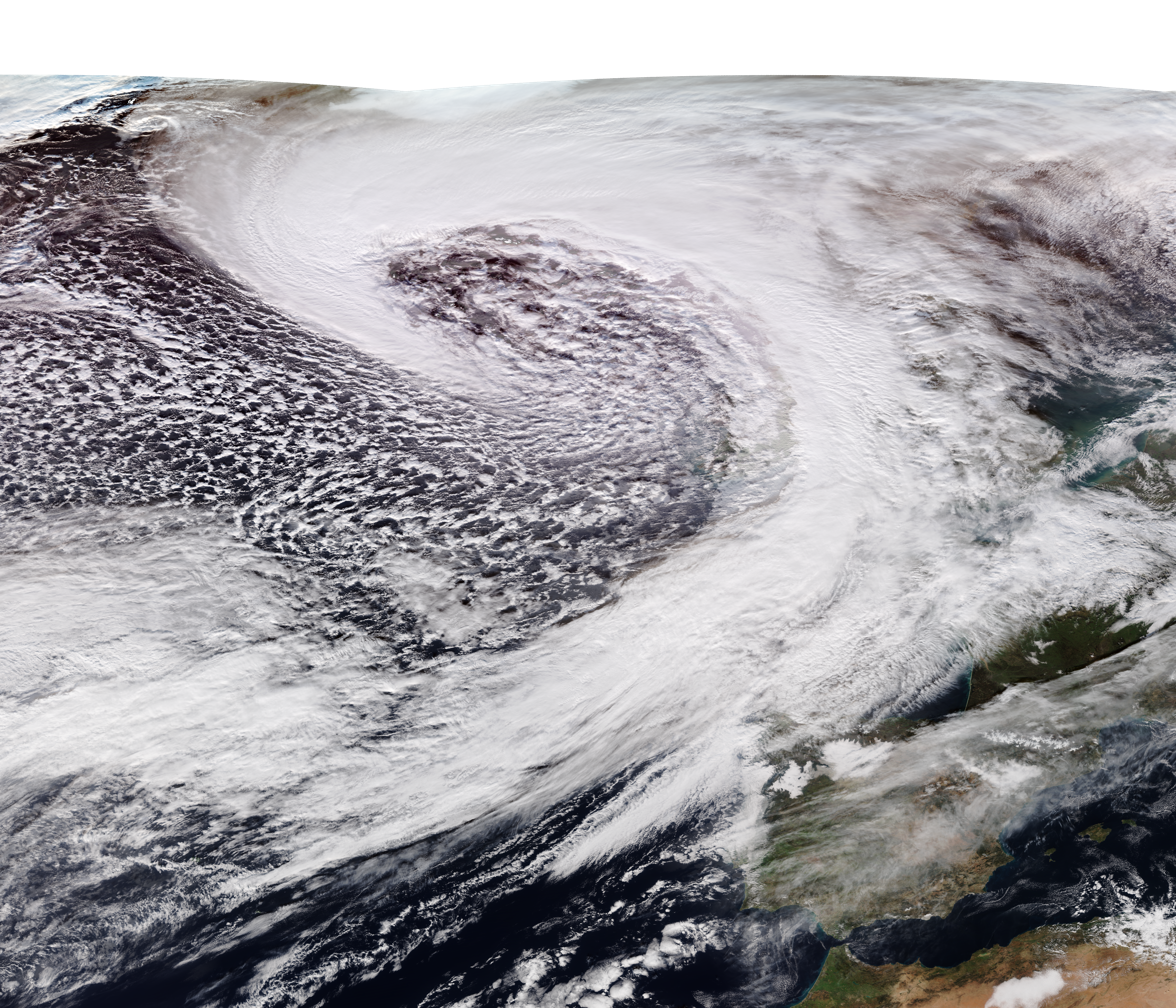
- Storm Brendan over the northeastern Atlantic on 13 January

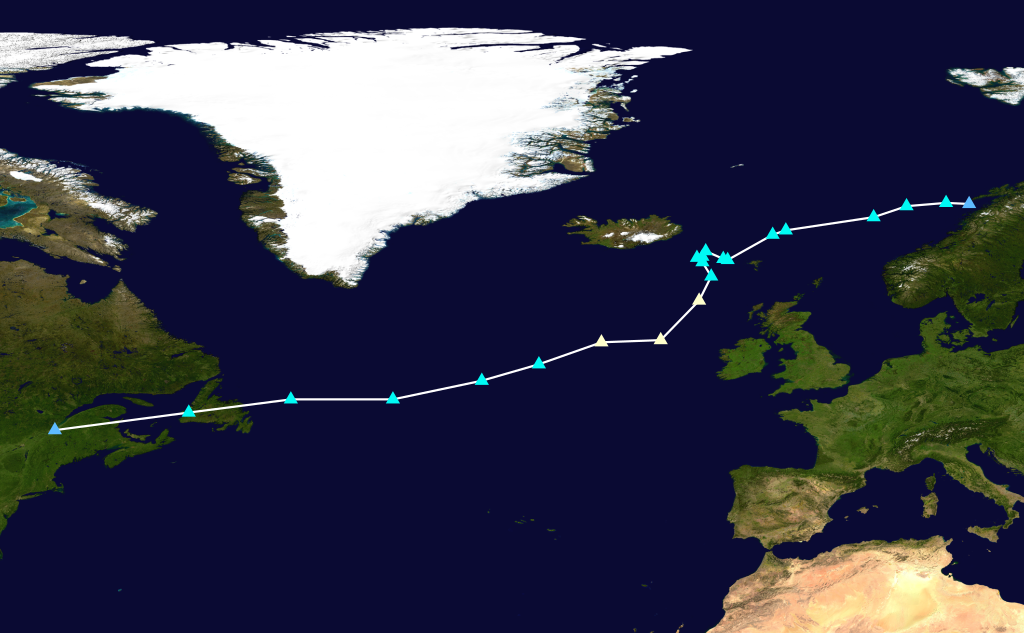
- Track and intensity of Brendan at six-hour intervals according to the Met Office and OPC
- Area affected: Ireland, United Kingdom, Faroe Islands, Iceland, Norway
- Date of impact: 10 January – 19 January
- Maximum wind gust: 182 km/h (113 mph; 98 kn)
- Lowest pressure: 940 mbar (28 inHg)
- Fatalities: 1
- Power outages: 100,000
- Damage: > £2 million (€2.3 million), preliminary

Storm Brendan first developed as a weak low along a frontal boundary over northern Texas on 10 January. This low moved slowly northeastwards across the United States without much development, crossing over Atlantic Canada and emerging into the Atlantic Ocean on 12 January. The low began to undergo explosive intensification as soon as it entered the Atlantic, and on 13 January Met Éireann named the low Brendan. The next day, the centre of Storm Brendan passed over the Faroe Islands at its peak intensity of 940 mbar (28 inHg), becoming the most intense storm of the season up to that point. Brendan subsequently stalled southeast of Iceland and began to slowly weaken as secondary lows accelerated around its large southern periphery. On 17 January, the much weakened centre of Storm Brendan's primary circulation made landfall in northern Norway, subsequently accelerating eastwards; it was last noted as a weakening frontal system over northeastern Russia on 19 January.

Storm Brendan made its closest approach to Ireland and the United Kingdom while at peak intensity late on 13 January, with the centre of the storm remaining just offshore to the north of Scotland. However, Brendan's large size resulted in impacts across the British Isles. Power outages were reported across Ireland, with more than 100,000 properties without electricity at the height of the storm. Transport was severely disrupted, with ferry cancellations across Scotland. All schools in the Outer Hebrides were closed as a result of dangerously high winds. The highest wind gust reported during Storm Brendan was 113 mph (182 km/h; 98 kn), recorded at Aonach Mòr in the Scottish Highlands. Preliminary damage totals as a result of Storm Brendan ran into the millions of dollars, and one person was killed.

=== Storm Gloria (Ilka) ===
Storm Gloria
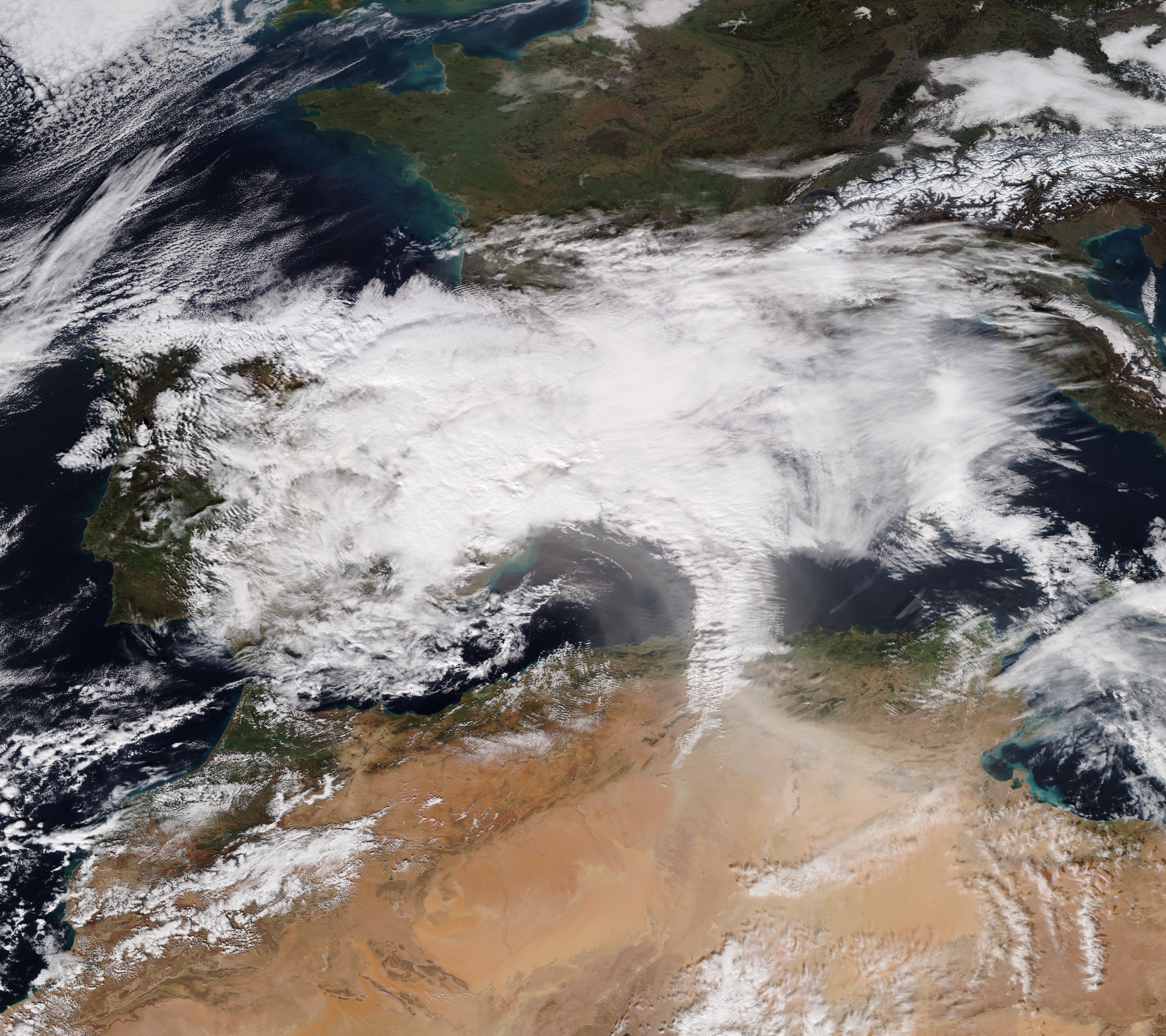
- Storm Gloria over the western Mediterranean on 21 January

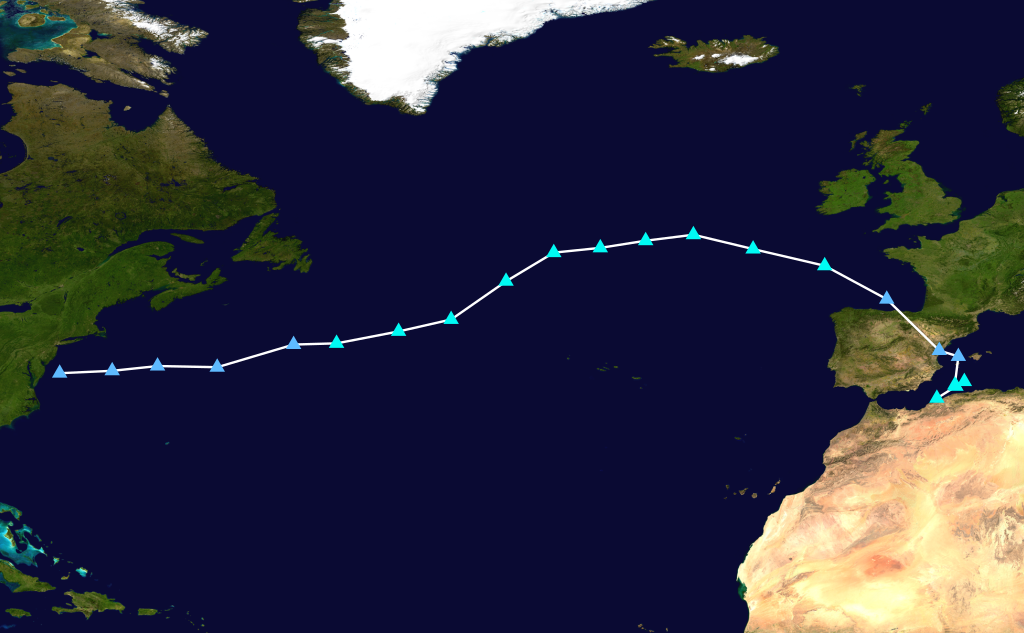
- Track and intensity of Storm Gloria at six-hour intervals according to the OPC
- Area affected: Portugal, Spain, France
- Date of impact: 9 January – 25 January
- Maximum wind gust: 133 km/h (83 mph; 72 kn)
- Lowest pressure: 993 mbar (29.3 inHg)
- Fatalities: 17
- Power outages: 31,000
- Damage: £150 million (€180 million), preliminary

The system that would eventually become Storm Gloria was first noted as a developing complex of low-pressure systems over the central United States on 9 January. A large trough associated with the low dug into the Southwestern United States from 10 January, providing a path for cold air that had been settled over Canada to move southwards and clash with warm, moist air moving northward from the Gulf of Mexico. This provided conditions for the low to develop and intensify as it moved eastwards across the United States before exiting into the north Atlantic on 13 January.

After stalling off the coast of North America for several days, the system began moving steadily eastwards across the open Atlantic on 17 January, reaching a peak intensity of 993 mbar (29.3 inHg) around that time. The State Meteorological Agency of Spain (AEMET) named the low Gloria on 18 January, issuing the first severe weather warnings as the storm was approaching the Iberian Peninsula. After turning southeastwards and entering the Bay of Biscay, Gloria subsequently made landfall close to Santander in northern Spain on 19 January.

Gloria quickly passed over northern Spain as a weak cyclone and then emerged into the western Mediterranean Sea, where it stalled for several days. After remaining nearly stationary near the Balearic Islands for around 48 hours, Gloria began to slowly drift southwards and then westwards, passing over the Strait of Gibraltar and northern Morocco on 22 January before emerging into the far eastern Atlantic on 23 January. After looping for several days offshore to the south and west of Portugal, Gloria dissipated on 25 January off the country's southern coast.

High winds and heavy rainfall caused severe damage along the path of Gloria. The highest recorded wind gust during the storm was 133 km/h (83 mph; 72 kn). Gloria's exceptionally slow movement resulted in severe flash flooding across northeastern Spain and southern France. In total, across France, Portugal and Spain, seventeen people were killed as a result of Storm Gloria, including three people whose bodies were never found. Preliminary damage totals relating to Gloria are at least £150 million (€180 million).

=== Storm Hervé (Petra) ===
Storm Hervé
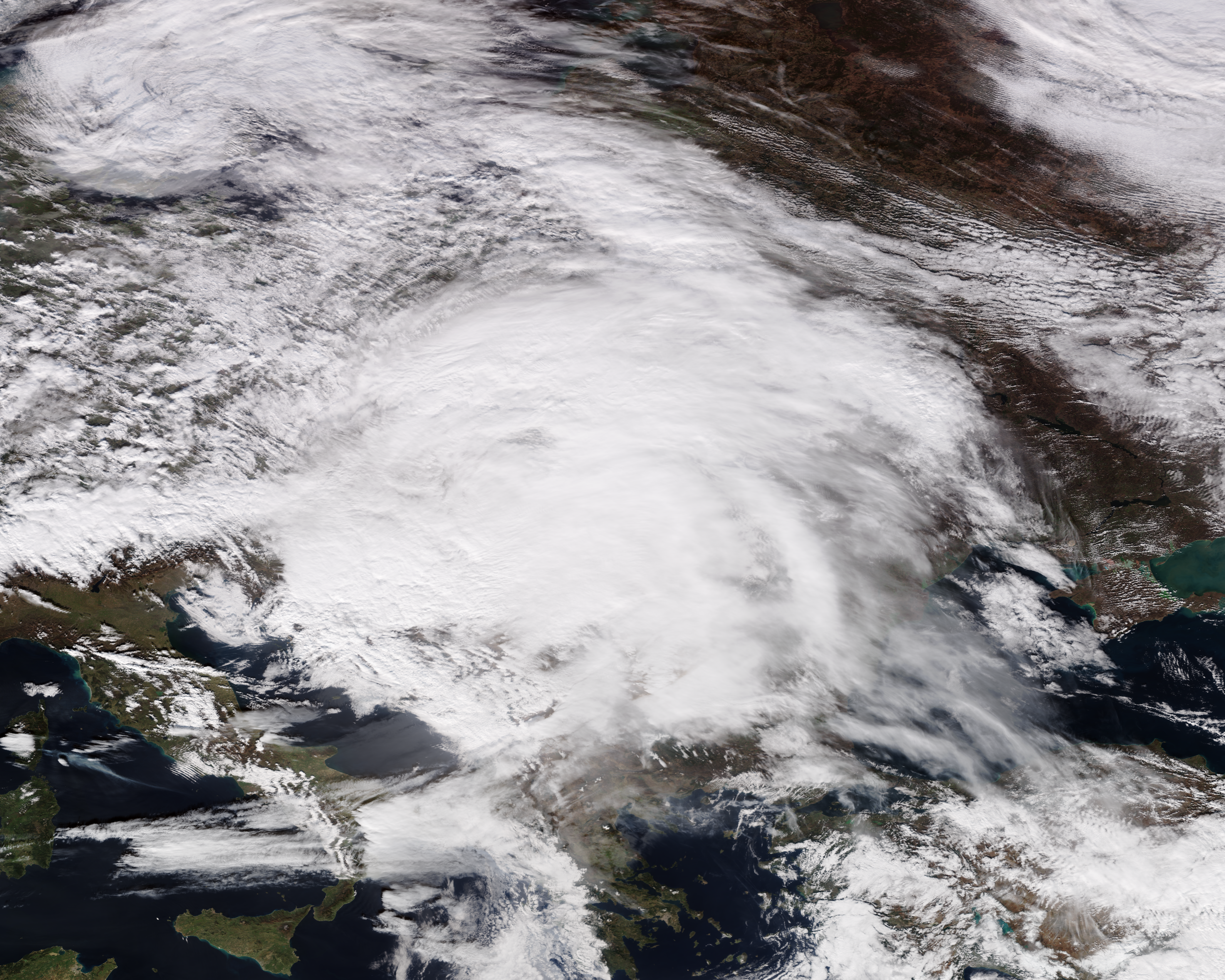
- Disorganised Storm Hervé over Eastern Europe on 4 February

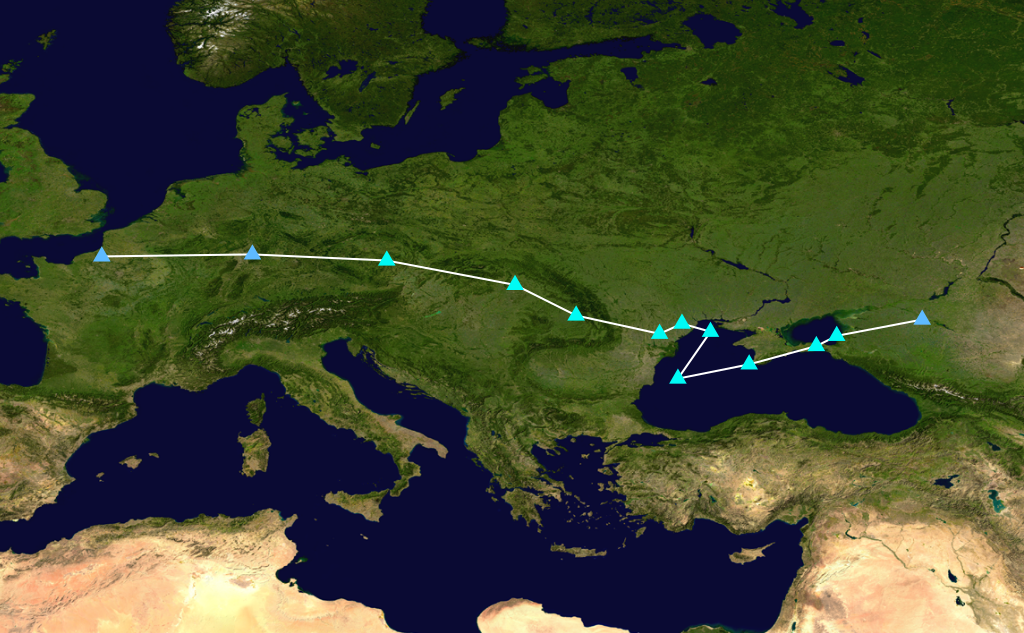
- Track and intensity of Storm Hervé at six-hour intervals according to the Met Office
- Area affected: France, Austria, Switzerland, Czech Republic, Germany, Romania
- Date of impact: 2 February – 8 February
- Maximum wind gust: 195 km/h (121 mph; 105 kn)
- Lowest pressure: 990 mbar (29 inHg)
- Fatalities: 3
- Damage: Minimal

Storm Hervé originated as a weak shortwave disturbance along a frontal boundary over the Azores on 2 February. Slowly developing as it drifted northeastwards along the frontal boundary, Météo-France named the weak low Hervé during the afternoon of 3 February. In the 12 hours that followed Storm Hervé being named, it moved into the Bay of Biscay and rapidly deepened from 1,012 mbar (29.9 inHg) to its initial peak intensity of 996 mbar (29.4 inHg). After entering the English Channel, Hervé moved generally eastward offshore between the United Kingdom and France, expanding in size before making landfall in Belgium on 4 February.

After landfall, Hervé accelerated southeastwards into Central Europe at a considerable forward pace, reaching its overall peak intensity of 990 mbar (29 inHg) on 5 February while centred over Romania. Hervé began to slow down and gradually weaken on 6 February as it emerged over the Black Sea; this weakening trend accelerated on 7 February, when Hervé degenerated back into a shortwave trough following landfall in far southern Russia. Hervé was last noted moving into eastern Turkey on 8 February, dissipating by the next day.

The most considerable impacts from Storm Hervé were felt in Central Europe. Strong wind gusts and flooding led to two deaths in Austria, and another person died in the Czech Republic as a result of Hervé. Overnight on 3–4 February, as Hervé was approaching from the west, it brought the highest winds recorded in Switzerland since 1981, also severely impacting southern Germany and Austria around the same time. The highest wind gust recorded during the storm was 195 km/h (121 mph; 105 kn) at Cap Corse in Corsica, France.

=== Storm Ciara (Sabine) ===
Storm Ciara
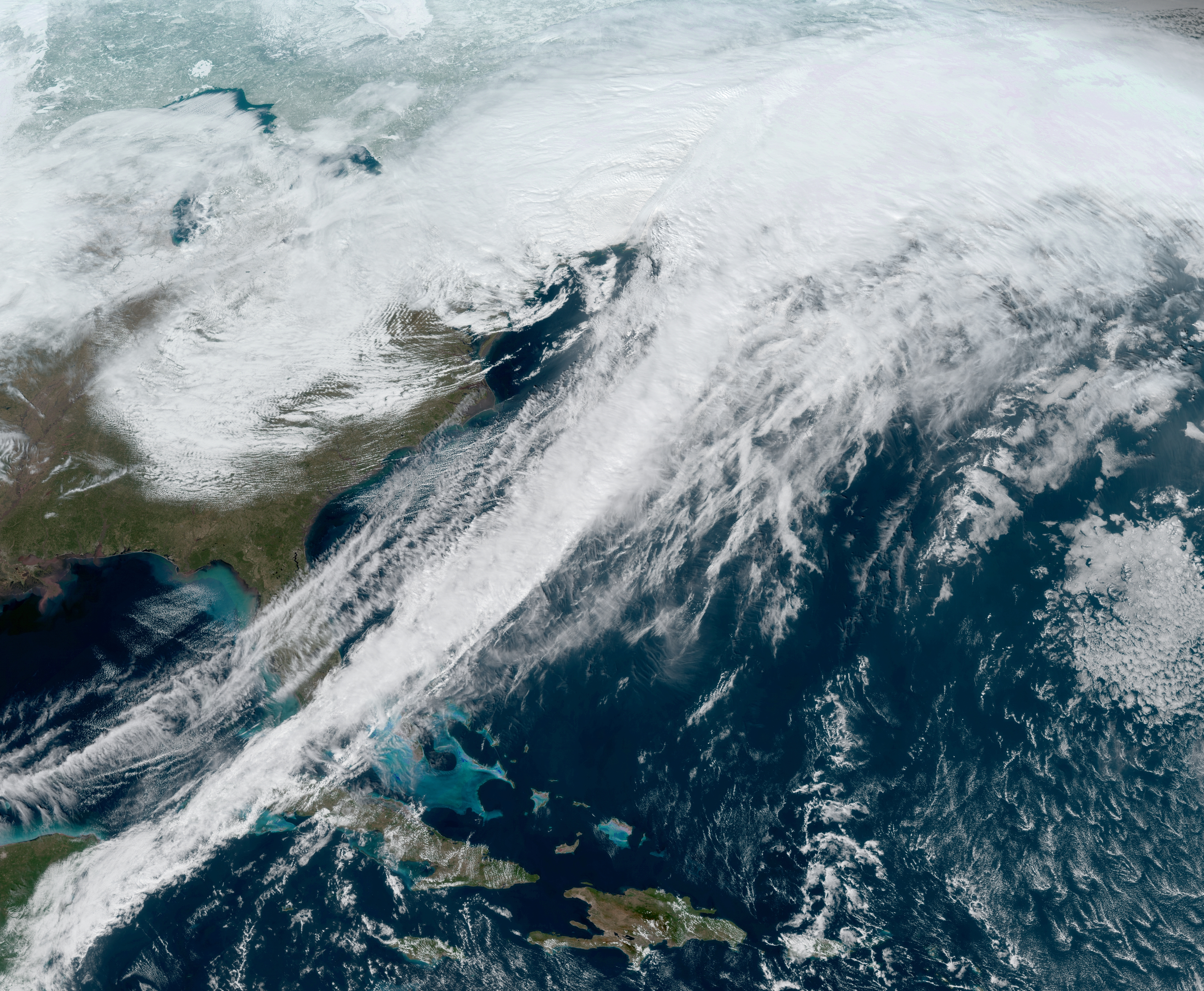
- The storm off the eastern coast of the United States on 7 February.

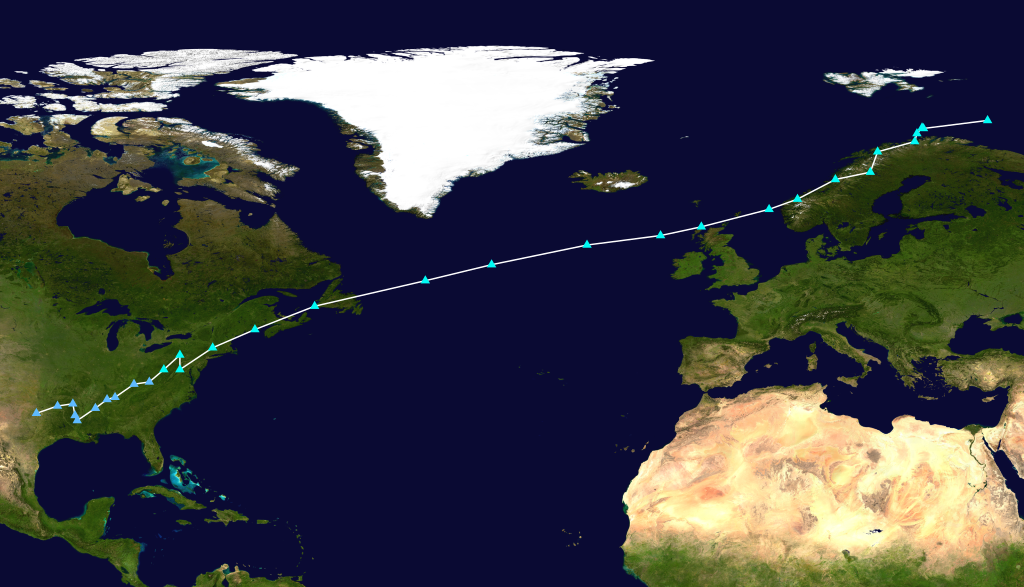
- Track of the storm according to the Ocean Prediction Center and Met Office.
- Area affected: Eastern United States, Ireland, United Kingdom, Belgium, The Netherlands, Germany, France
- Date of impact: 8–10 February 2020
- Maximum wind gust: 219 km/h (136 mph; 118 kn)
- Lowest pressure: 943 mbar (27.8 inHg)
- Fatalities: 13

On 4 February 2020, the Met Office issued a yellow weather warning for wind covering all of the United Kingdom across the following weekend due to high confidence in the model forecasts for a potential high-impact storm, although the system involved had not yet formed and no name was issued for it at that time. The next day, Storm Ciara (Note: In this case, Ciara is pronounced Kee-ra according to official Met Éireann guidance issued at the time the naming list was announced, although there are multiple alternative pronunciations of the name Ciara.) was formally named by the Met Office; in Germany the storm is called Sabine. It formed out of a weak area of low pressure emerging into the Atlantic Ocean from the southeastern United States earlier that day; the precursor system had previously brought heavy snowfall to large tracts of the United States and Eastern Canada, with tornadoes across the southern and mid-Atlantic states.

On 6 February, Met Éireann issued a country-wide yellow wind and rain warning for Saturday 8 February through Sunday 9 February, expecting average wind speeds from 50 to 65 km/h (31 to 40 mph; 27 to 35 kn) and gusts up to 110 km/h (68 mph; 59 kn) and rainfall of up to 40 mm (1.6 in). Additional orange wind warnings were issued for the counties Galway, Mayo and Donegal on 7 February.

The Royal Netherlands Meteorological Institute (KNMI) issued a country-wide yellow wind warning on 7 February, expecting wind gusts up to 120 km/h (75 mph; 65 kn). The same date, the Met Office issued an amber warning for southeast England for Sunday. The rest of the United Kingdom remained under a yellow wind warning. The agency expects gusting of 80 to 97 km/h (50 to 60 mph; 43 to 52 kn) across the country, with the possibility of gusts up to 130 km/h (80 mph; 70 kn) along the coastal regions. On 8 February, the KNMI updated their warning to orange for wind gusts up to 130 km/h (81 mph) in the whole country. The Royal Dutch Football Association (KNVB) also postponed all premier league matches set for 9 February.

On 9 February, the storm set above Belgium; due to the strong winds, the Royal Belgian Football Association (KBVB) postponed all football events on this day and also the Vlaamse Aardbeiencross was cancelled.

Ciara caused an estimated €500 million in damage in Germany.

=== Storm Inès (Tomris) ===
Storm Inès
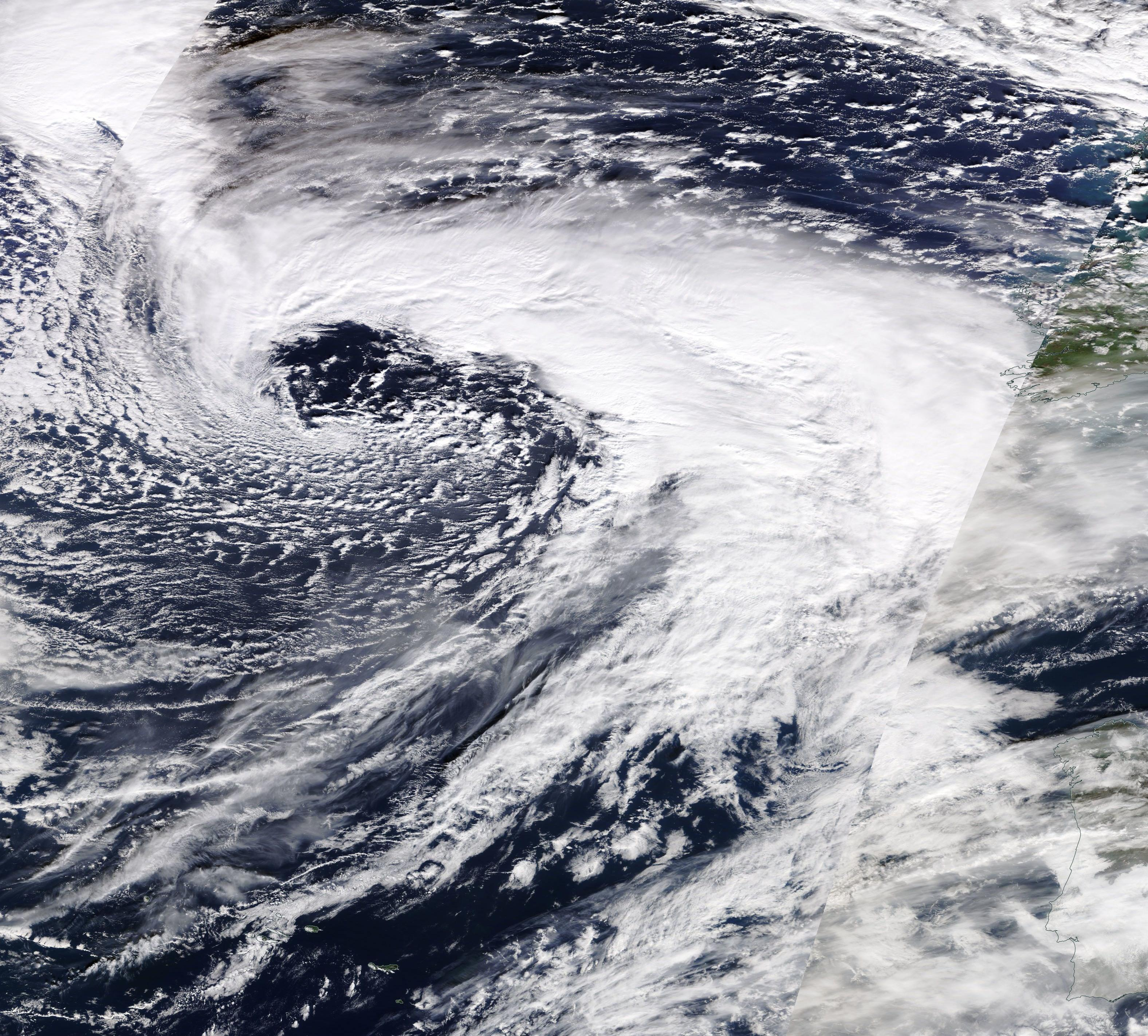
- Storm Inès approaching Ireland on 12 February.

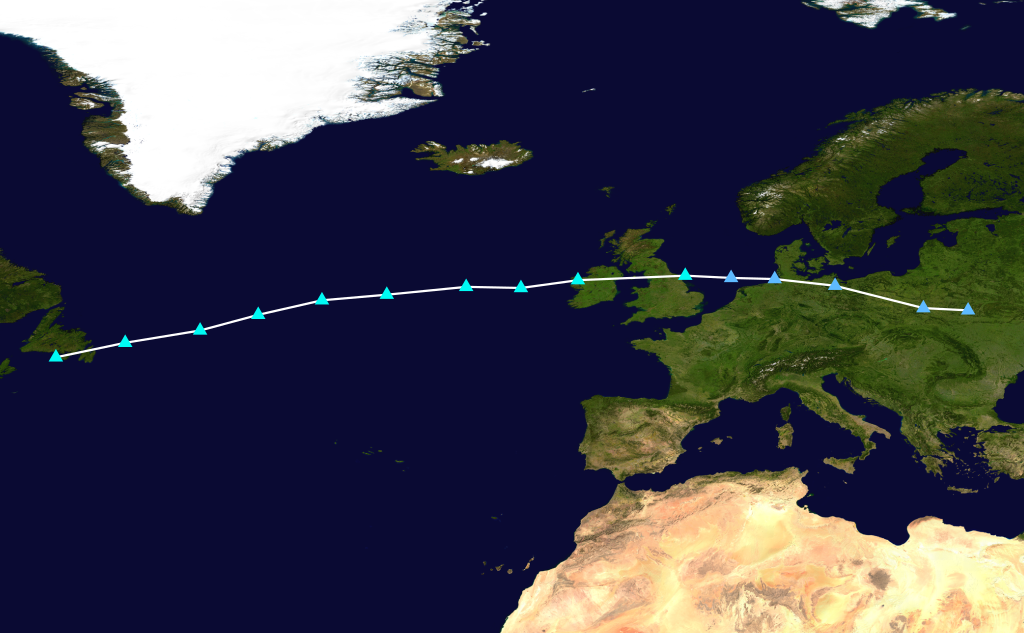
- Track of storm Inès according to the Ocean Prediction Center.
- Area affected: France, Spain, Ireland, United Kingdom, Netherlands, Belgium, Germany
- Date of impact: 13 February 2020
- Maximum wind gust: 132 km/h (82 mph; 71 kn), Pointe du Raz, Brittany, France
- Lowest pressure: 976 mbar (28.8 inHg)

Inès was named by the French meteorological agency, Météo-France, on 12 February 2020. The agency issued yellow and orange warnings for wind speeds of up to 130 km/h (81 mph; 70 kn) in the northern parts of the country.

Inès formed above Newfoundland on 11 February. It affected primarily France with wind speeds up to and surpassing 130 km/h (81 mph; 70 kn) on 13 February, while it brought waves up to 6 m (20 ft) from the Galician to Cantabrian coast.

=== Storm Dennis (Victoria) ===
Storm Dennis
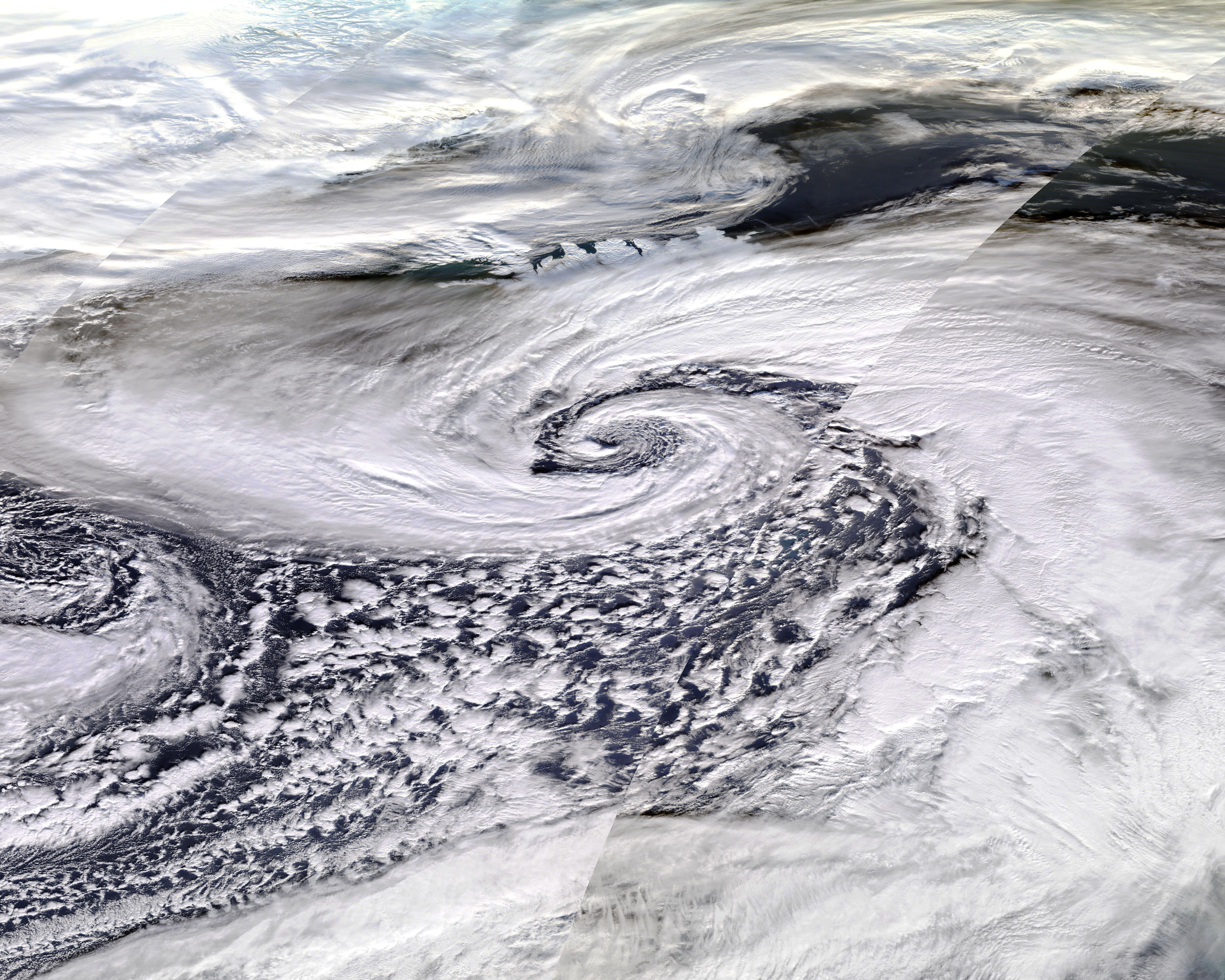
- Dennis above the Atlantic Ocean on 14 February, with its cold front flanking the east coast of North America.

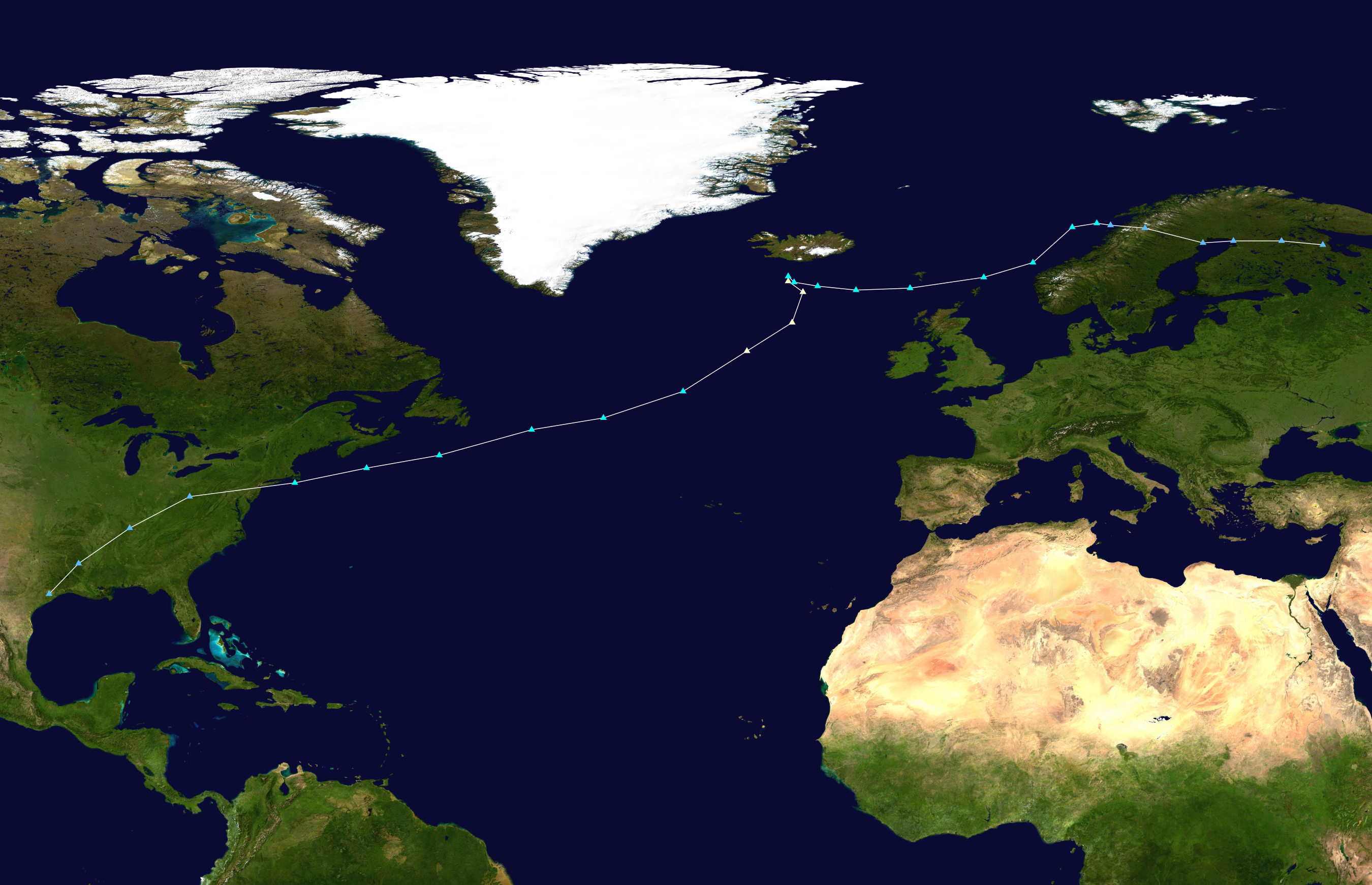
- Track of storm Dennis according to the Ocean Prediction Center.
- Area affected: Ireland, United Kingdom, Iceland, Netherlands, Belgium, France, Norway
- Date of impact: 11–18 February 2020
- Maximum wind gust: 230 km/h (140 mph; 120 kn)
- Lowest pressure: 920 mbar (27 inHg)

Storm Dennis was named jointly by the UK Met Office, Met Éireann and the Netherlands Meteorological Service on 11 February, with heavy rain and strong winds expected to affect the UK from 15 February. It was quickly nicknamed "Dennis the Menace," as a reference from The Beano character of the same name.

=== Storm Jorge (Charlotte) ===
Storm Jorge
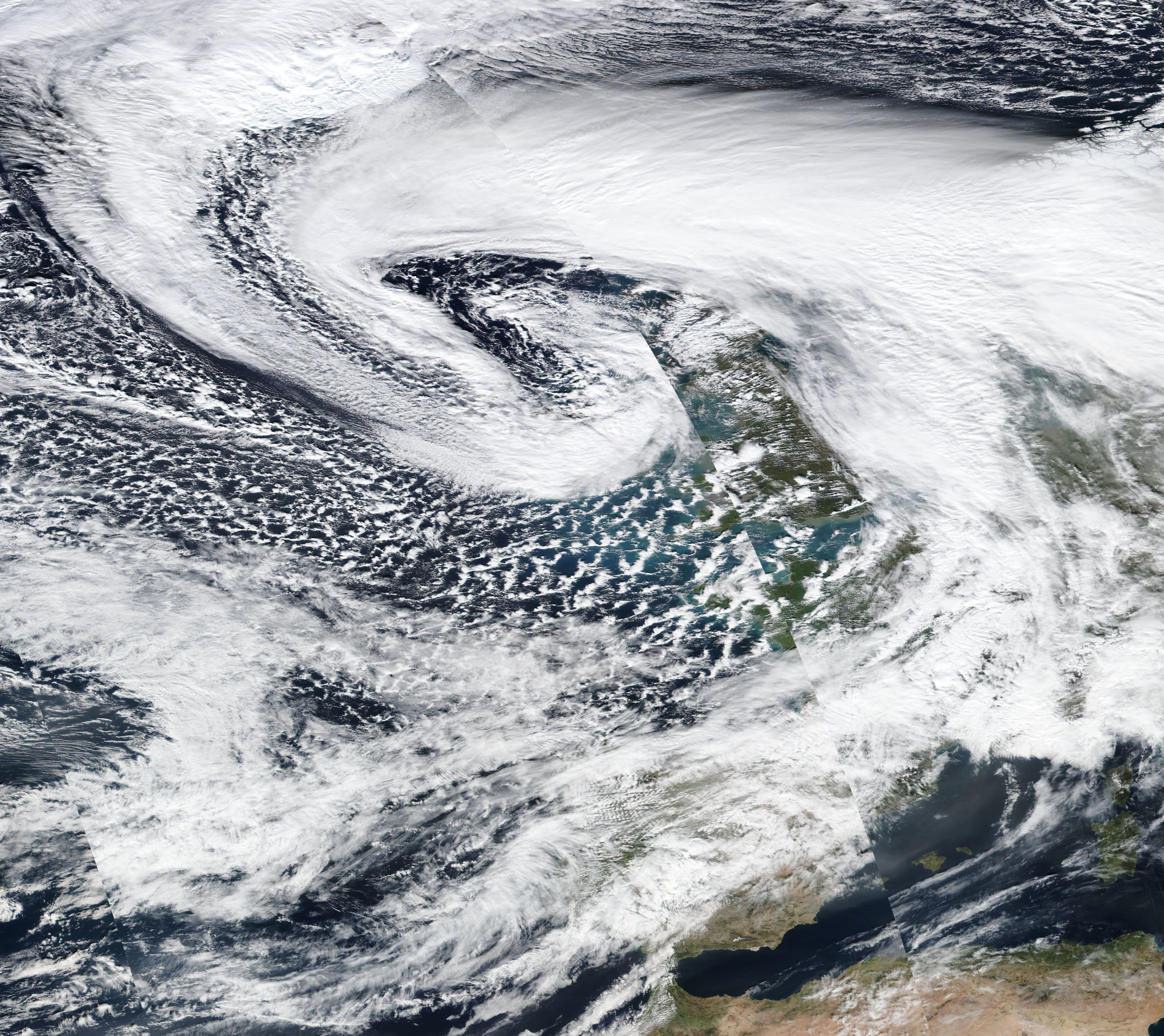
- Jorge approaching the British Isles on 29 February.

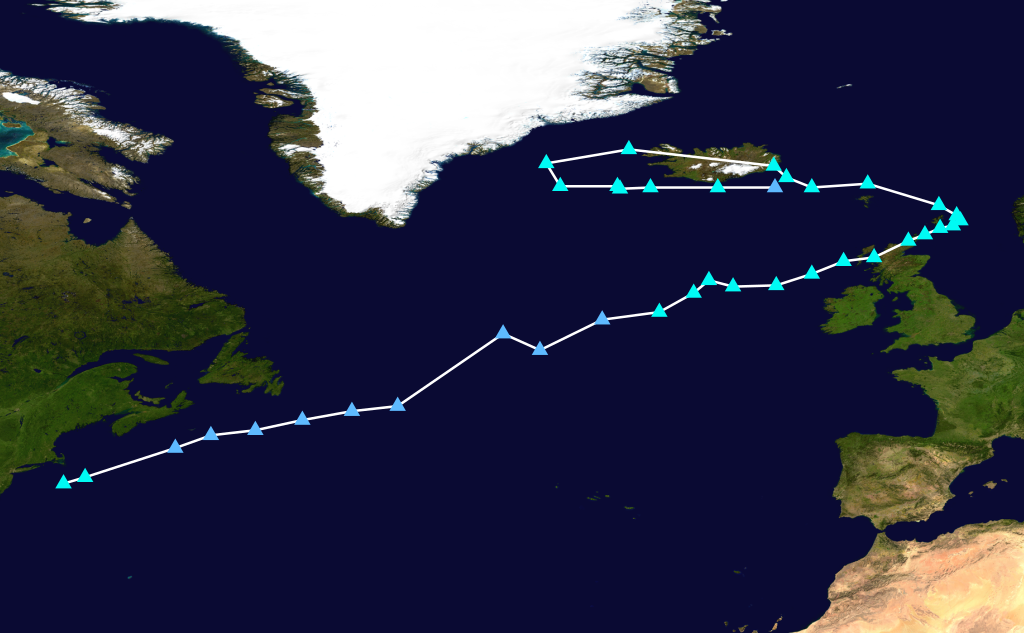
- Track of storm Jorge according to the Ocean Prediction Center and Met Office.
- Area affected: United Kingdom, Ireland, Iceland
- Date of impact: 25 February–5 March 2020
- Lowest pressure: 952 mbar (28.1 inHg)

Jorge was named by the Spanish meteorological agency on 27 February. The agency warned for seas up to 5 m (16 ft) high and snow from 1,000 m (3,300 ft). Met Eireann issued Status Red wind warnings for County Galway and County Clare and Status Orange wind warnings for the remainder of the country, while in the United Kingdom the Met Office issued yellow wind warnings for all of Wales and Northern Ireland, most of England and parts of Scotland before it even hit Iceland.

=== Storm Karine (Diana III) ===
Storm Karine
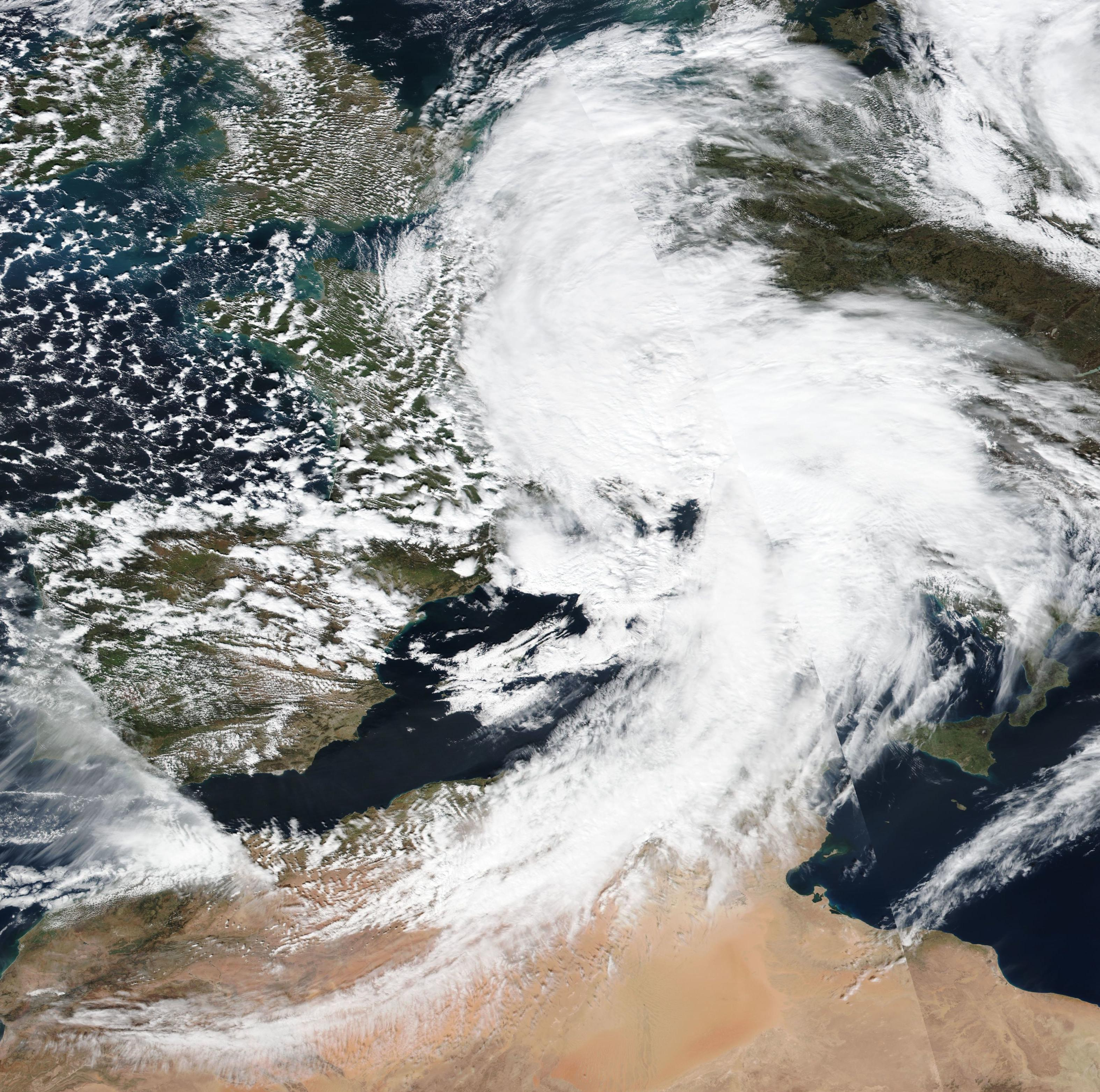
- Karine covering much of southern Europe on 2 March.

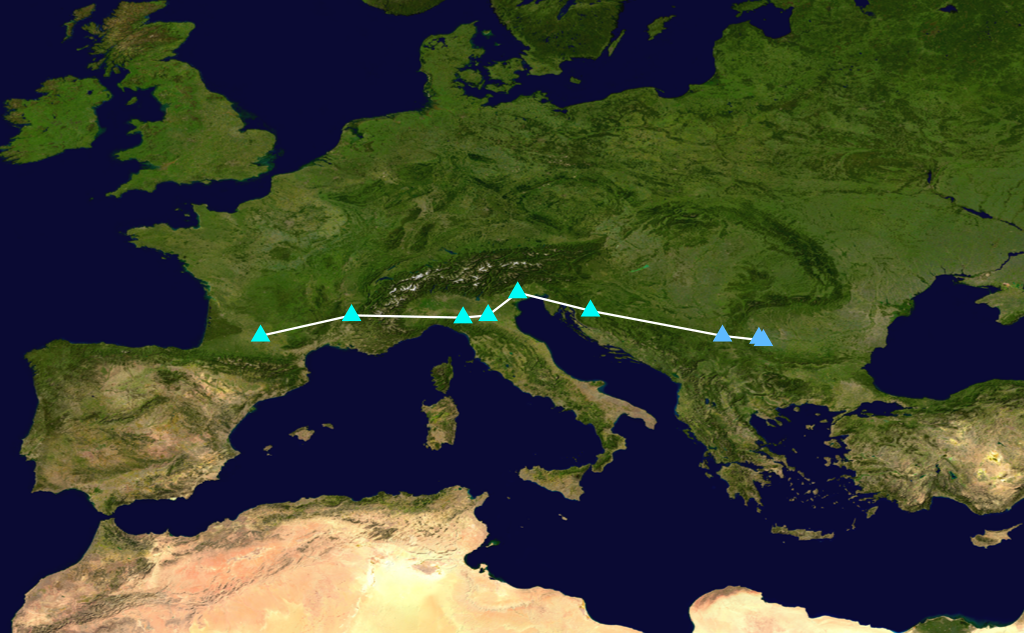
- Track of storm Karine according to the Ocean Prediction Center and Met Office.
- Area affected: France, Spain, Italy
- Date of impact: 29 February–4 March 2020
- Lowest pressure: 984 mbar (29.1 inHg)

Storm Karine was named by AEMET on 29 February to impact on 2 March. The storm was named before Leon, however Leon developed before Karine on 1 March and so alphabetical order does not correspond to chronological order of these two storms.

=== Storm Leon (Diana II) ===
Storm Leon
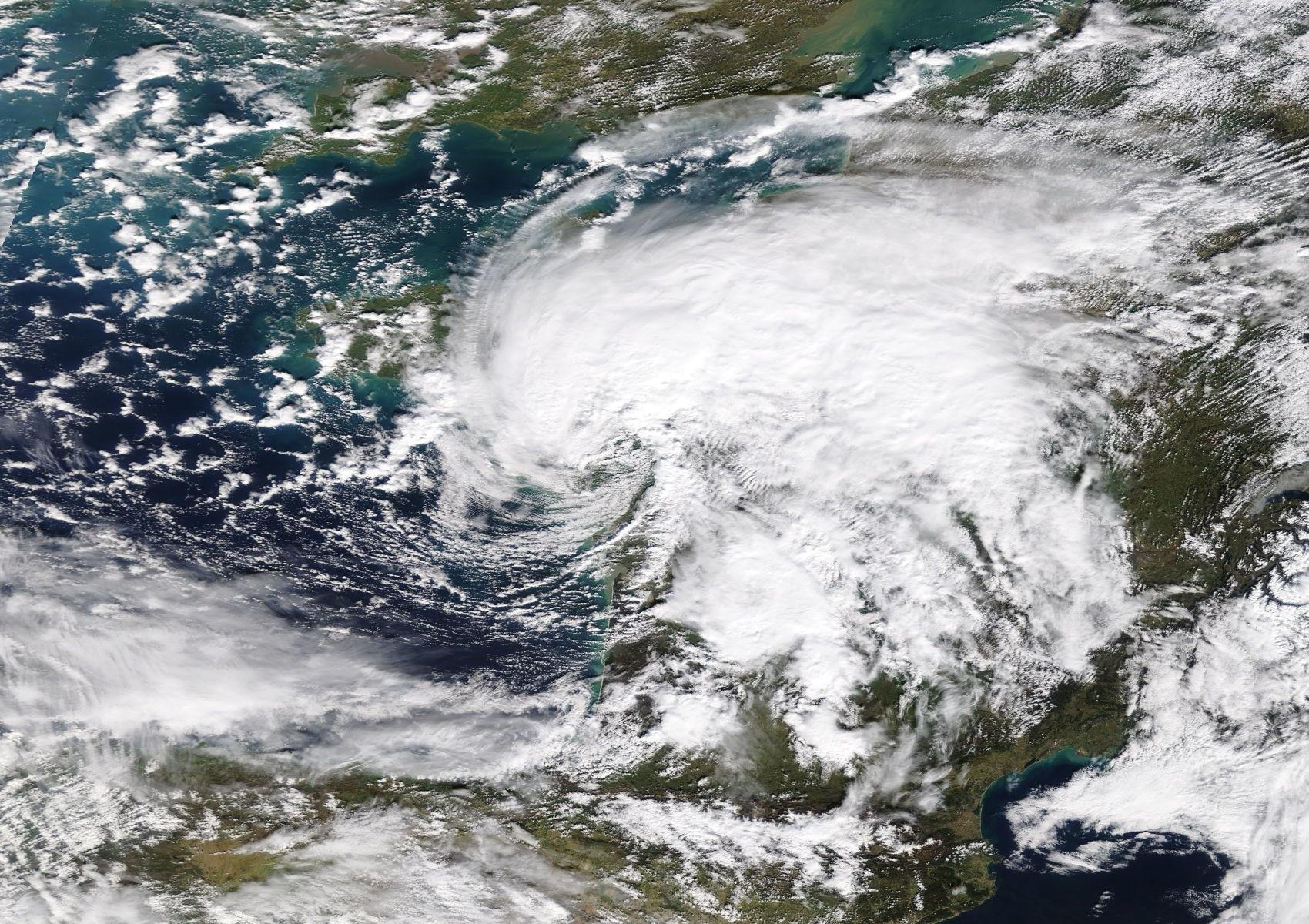
- The storm covering much of France on 1 March.

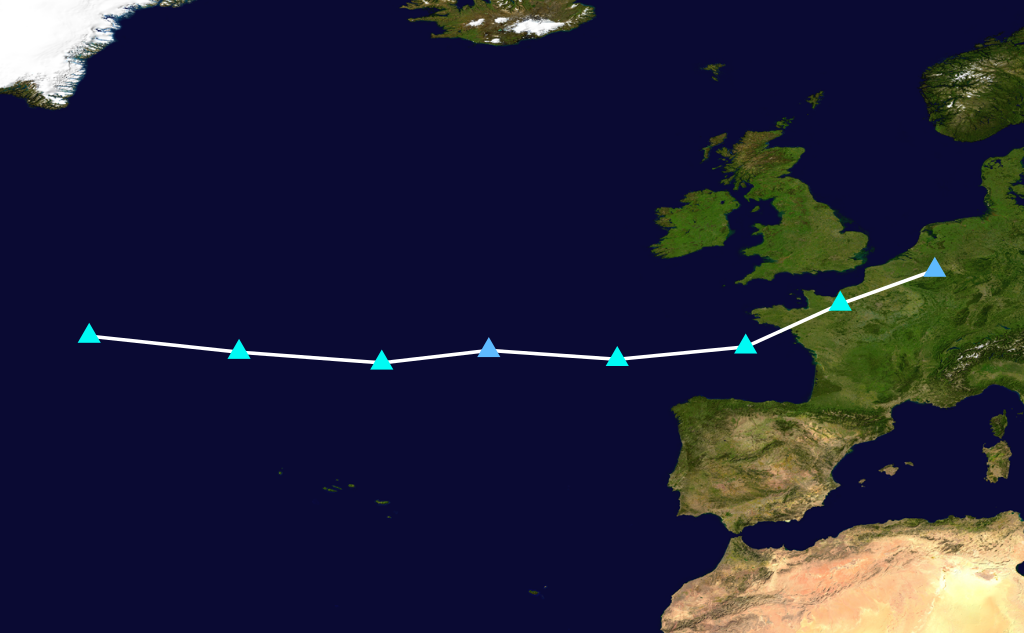
- Track of storm Leon according to the Ocean Prediction Center.
- Area affected: Spain, France, Belgium
- Date of impact: 29 February–1 March 2020
- Lowest pressure: 990 mbar (29.2 inHg)

Storm Leon was named by MétéoFrance on 1 March to affect the country later the same day.

=== Storm Myriam ===
Storm Myriam
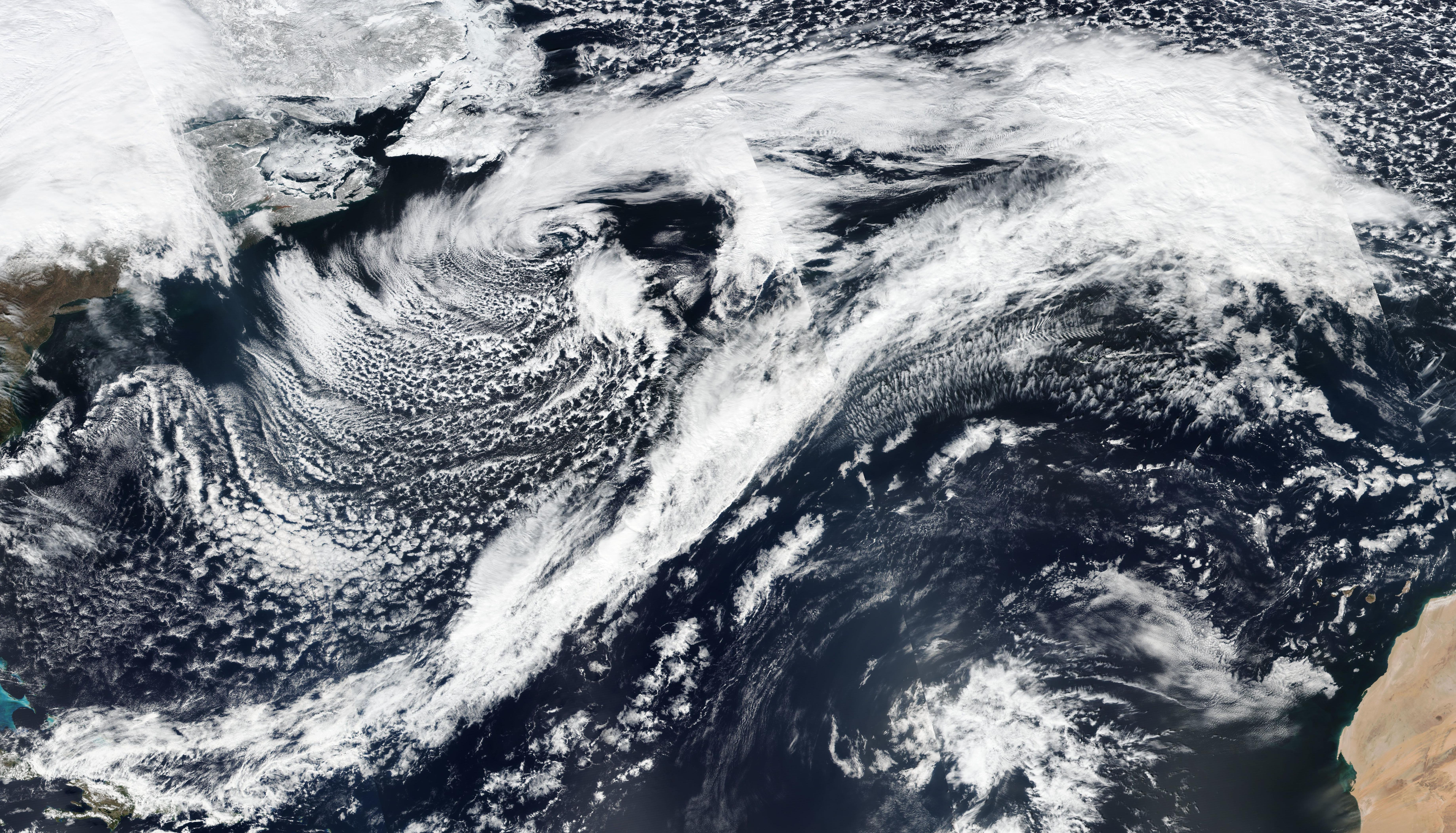
- The storm above the Atlantic Ocean on 2 March.

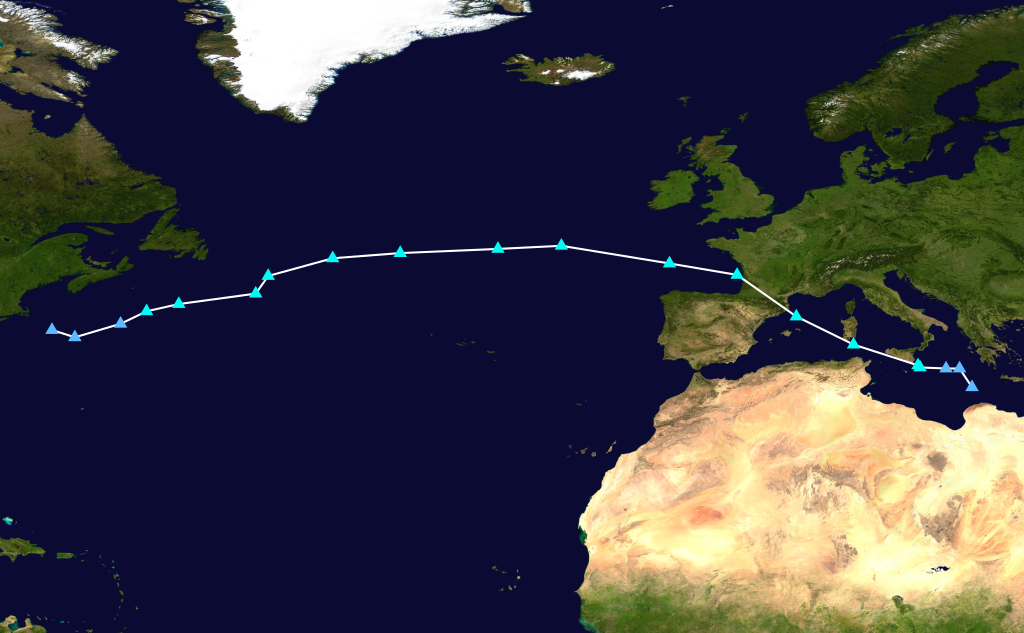
- Track of storm Myriam according to the Ocean Prediction Center and Met Office.
- Area affected: Spain, France, Corsica, Malta, Italy
- Date of impact: 29 February–5 March 2020
- Lowest pressure: 992 mbar (29.3 inHg)

=== Storm Norberto (Elli) ===
Storm Norberto
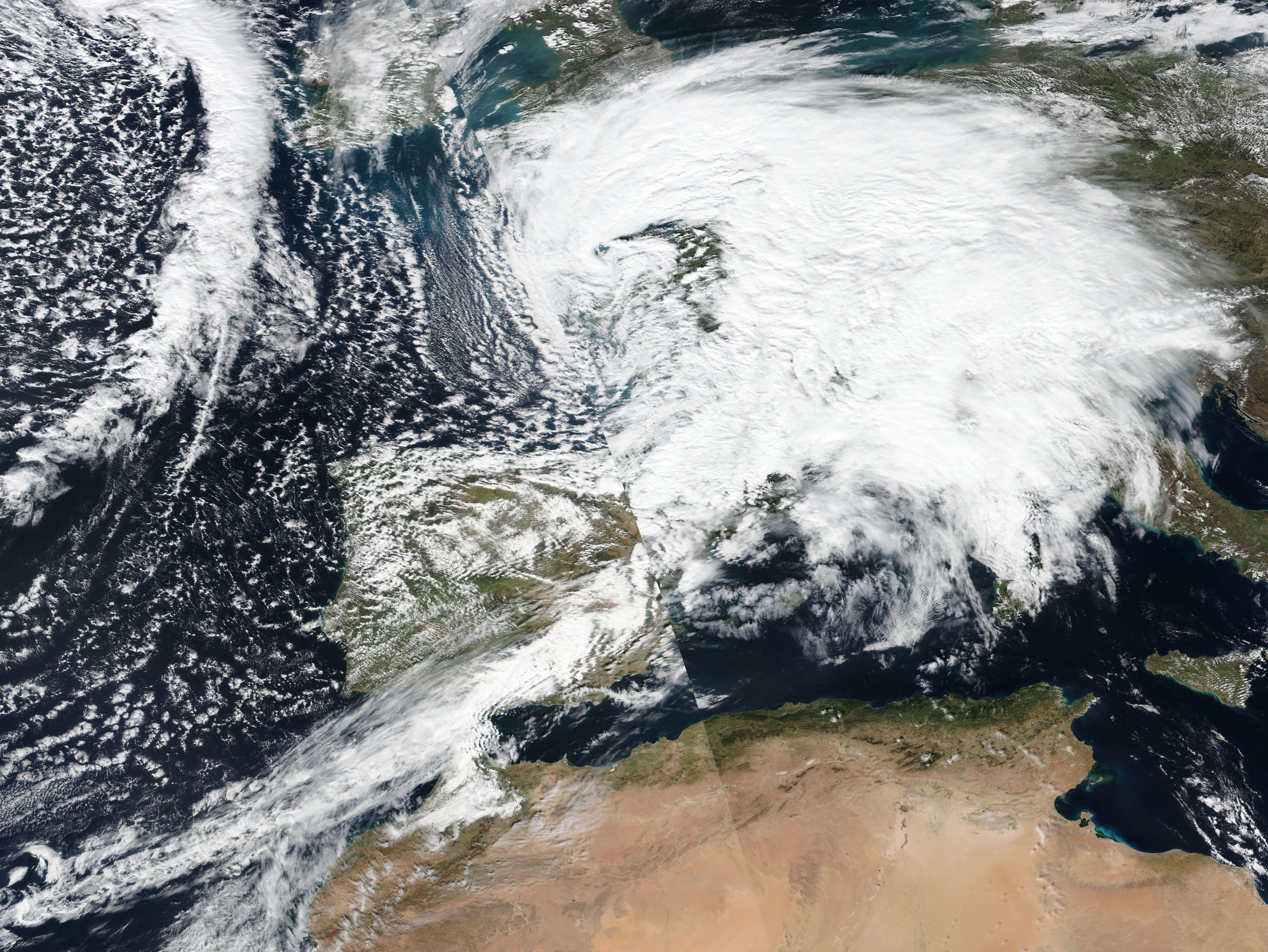
- Norberto covering parts of Europe on 5 March.

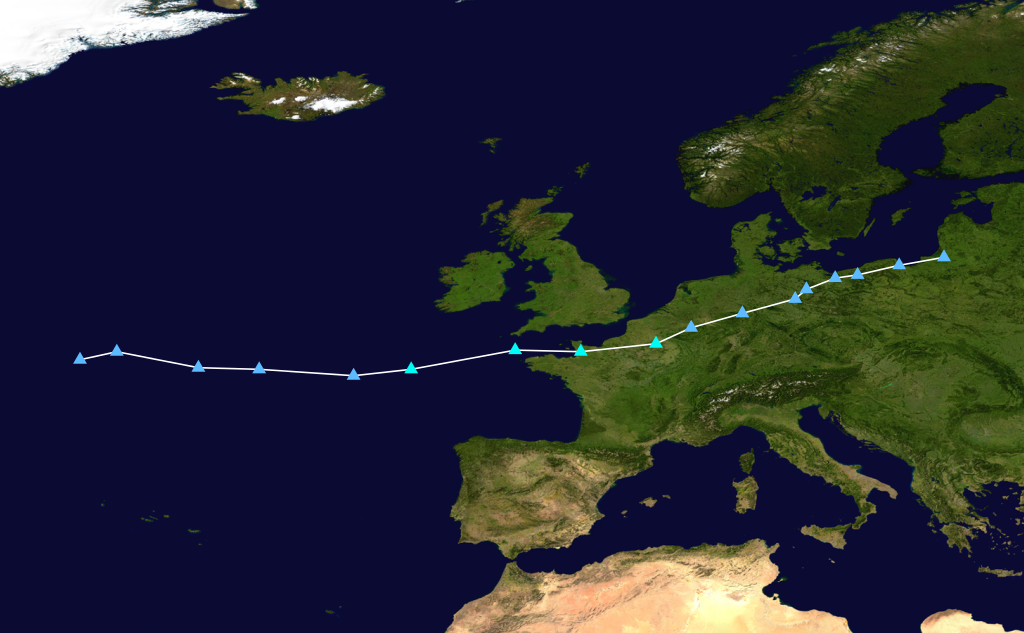
- Track of storm Norberto according to the Ocean Prediction Center and Met Office.
- Area affected: France, Germany, Poland
- Date of impact: 3–7 March 2020
- Lowest pressure: 982 mbar (29.0 inHg)

=== Storm Edouard ===
Storm Edouard
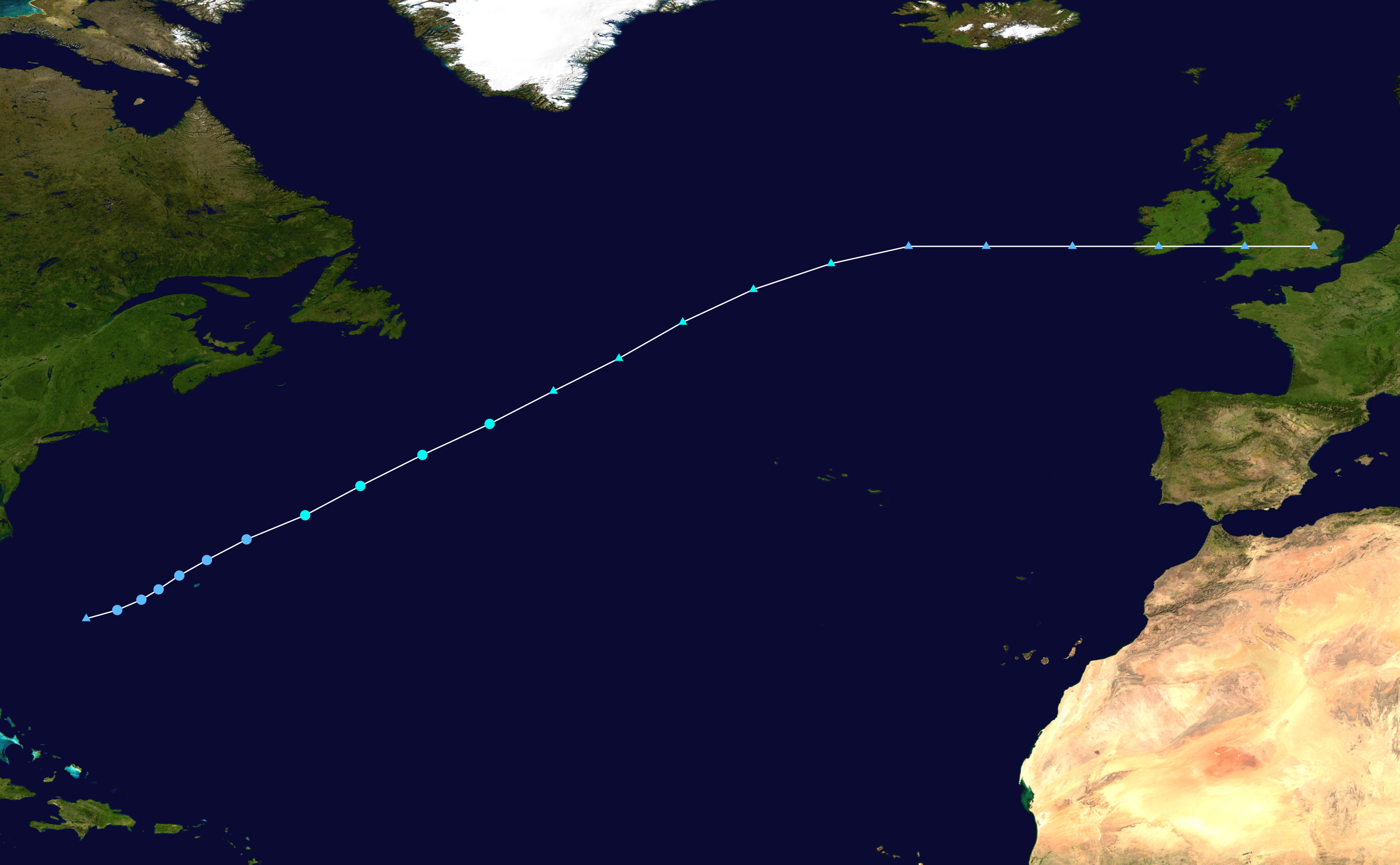
- Track of Tropical Storm Edouard
- Area affected: United Kingdom Ireland Netherlands Germany Denmark & Poland
- Date of impact: 4 – 11 July 2020
- Lowest pressure: 1,005 mbar (29.7 inHg)
- Fatalities: 0
- Power outages: minimal

Tropical Storm Edouard's extratropical low began to slowly weaken on 8 July, turning eastward and continuing to move rapidly within the strong mid-latitude westerlies in the Atlantic. It crossed southern Ireland and the southern United Kingdom on 9 July and dissipated over the latter country that day, Edouard's extratropical remnants brought brief, but heavy, rain to the British Isles, the Netherlands, Germany, southern Denmark and north-west Poland between 8 July – 11 July 2020.

=== Storm Ellen ===
Storm Ellen
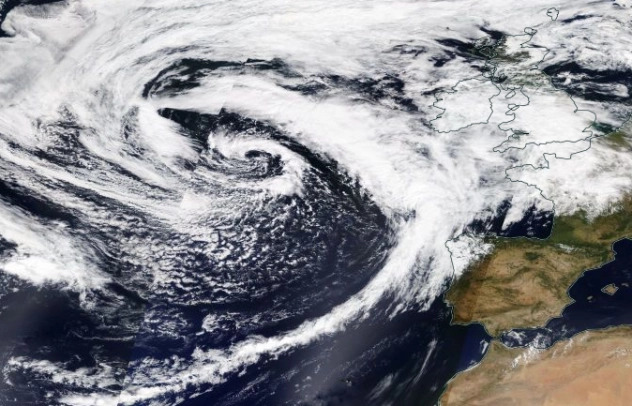
- Area affected: United Kingdom & Ireland
- Date of impact: 18 – 27 August 2020
- Maximum wind gust: 143 km/h (89 mph; 77 kn) Roche's Point, Ireland
- Lowest pressure: 966.4 mbar (28.54 inHg)
- Fatalities: 4
- Power outages: 194,000

Storm Ellen was named by the Irish Meteorological Office on 18 August 2020.

On 18 August, Met Éireann issued a Status Orange wind warning for counties Galway, Mayo, Clare, Cork, Kerry, Limerick and Waterford for Wednesday, 19 August through Thursday, 20 August, expecting gusts of between 110 km/h and 130 km/h. On 19 August, a Status Red wind warning for Cork was issued valid from Wednesday 19 August until midnight. On 20 August, Ellen absorbed the remnants of Tropical Storm Kyle.

Over 194,000 homes and businesses were left without power as the storm battered the country with severe gusts of up to 143 km/h (89 mph; 77 kn) which led to fallen trees and flooding overnight. On 20 August, Met Éireann issued a Status Yellow wind warning for counties Dublin, Louth, Wexford, Wicklow, Meath, Cork, Kerry and Waterford, expecting very strong winds and a continued risk of coastal flooding.

=== Storm Francis (Kirsten) ===
Storm Francis
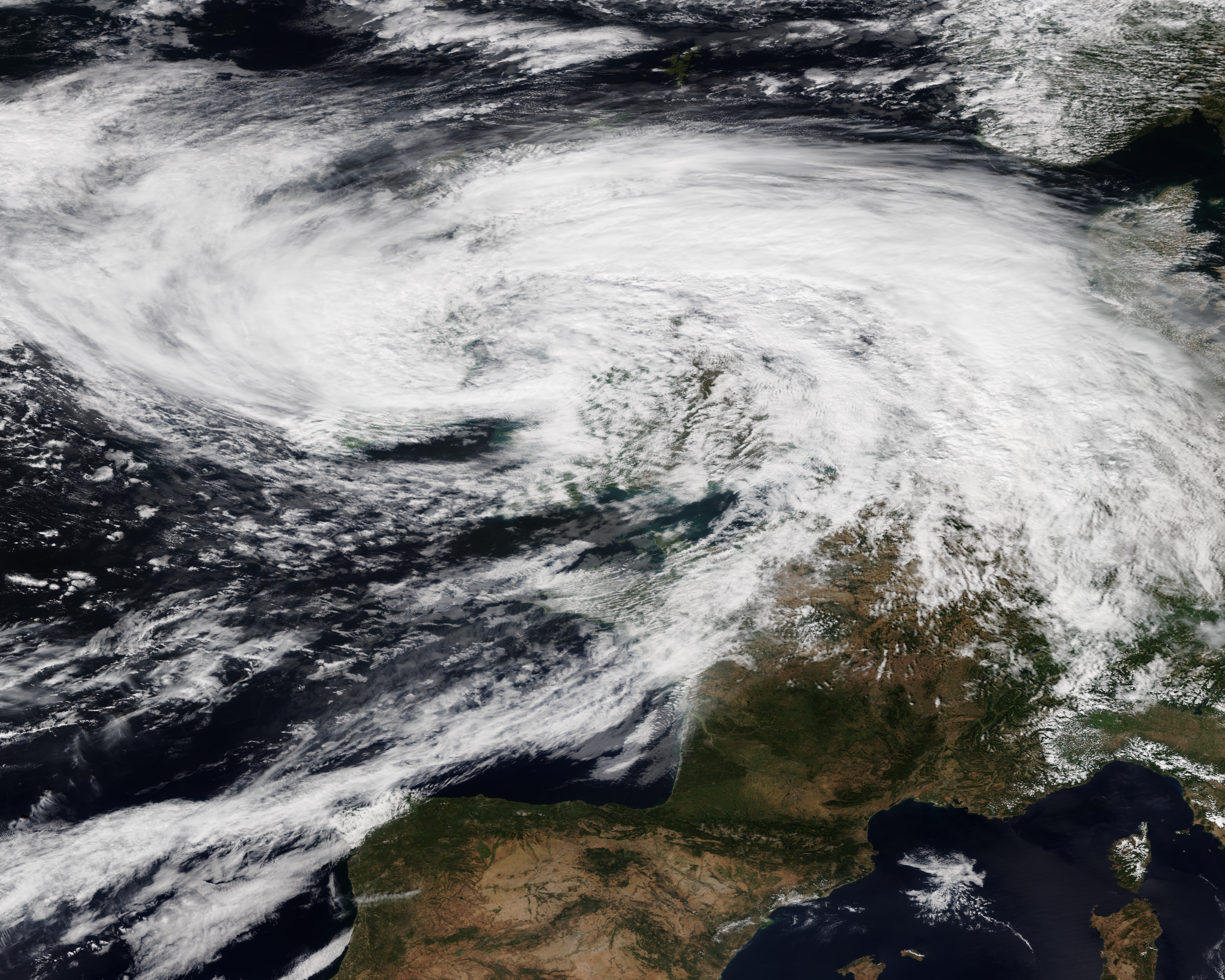
- Francis crossing the British Isles on 25 August
- Area affected: Great Britain, Ireland, Belgium and the Netherlands
- Date of impact: 24 – 27 August 2020
- Maximum wind gust: 160 km/h (100 mph; 87 kn)
- Lowest pressure: 979 mbar (28.9 inHg)

Storm Francis was named by the UK Met Office on 24 August. It was forecast to make landfall off the West Coast of Ireland on 25 August, with very severe winds, rain and impacts for most of the country, as well as the west of the UK. 2 yellow weather warnings for Wind & Rain were issued by the Met Office for the storm's impacts on 25 & 26 August.

In Wales, Storm Francis was the cause of a large amount of flash flooding in the South of the country, as an indirect cause of this many homes were left without power.

Met Éireann issued Status Orange - Rainfall warning for Connacht, Cavan, Monaghan, Donegal, Wexford, Cork, Kerry and Waterford. This warning was issued on 24 August 2020 11:00 and valid between 24 August 2020 21:00 and 25 August 2020 17:00. Status Yellow - Rainfall warning was put in place for all remaining counties, including Northern Ireland's counties. Eastern counties received Status Yellow - Wind warning as well.

The KMI from Belgium issued an orange warning for summerstorm Francis.

In The Netherlands the KNMI issued a yellow warning. The storm peaked with wind gusts up to 107 km/h (66 mph; 58 kn).

=== Storm Odette (Wicca) ===
Storm Odette
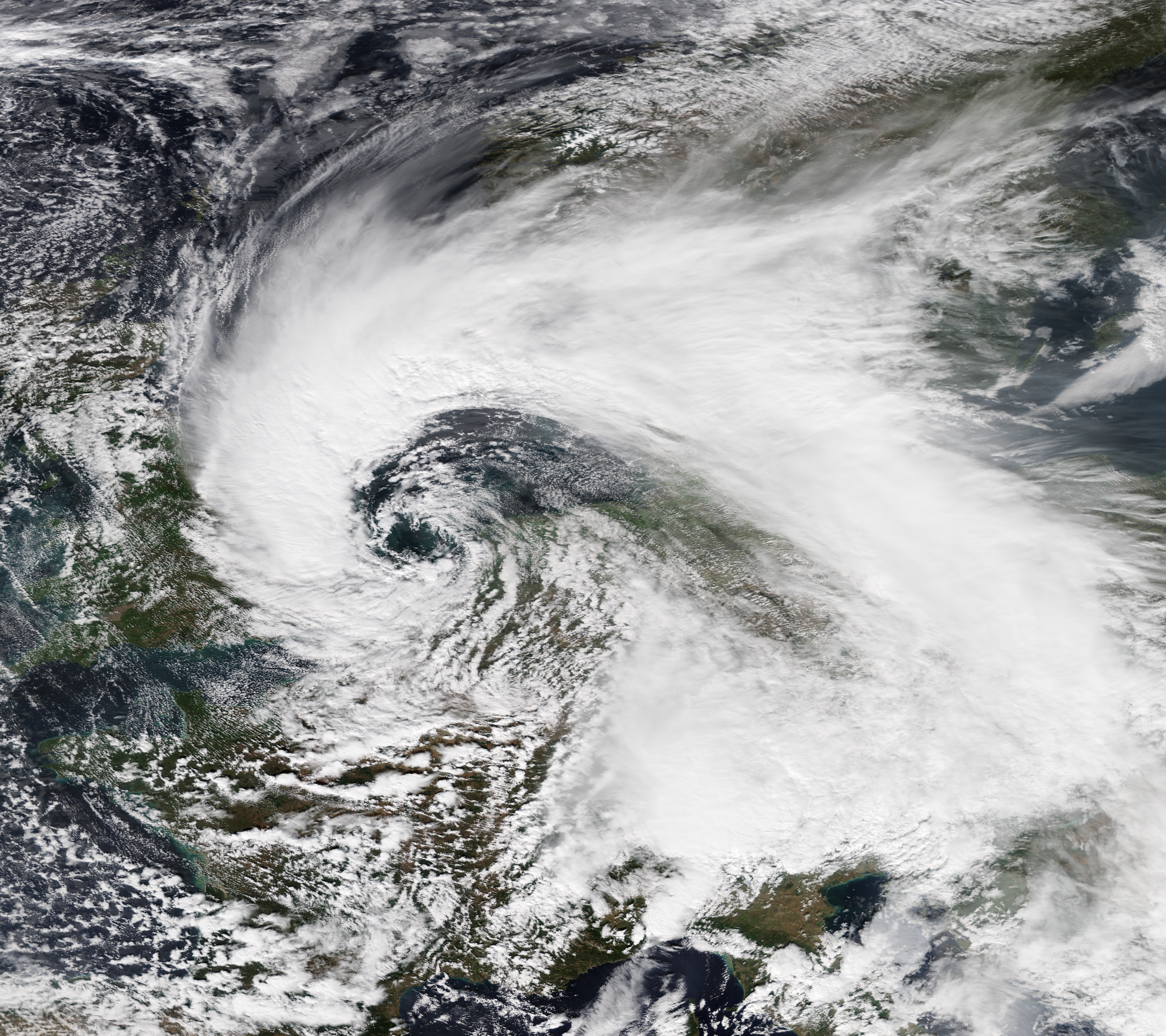
- Odette over the North Sea on 25 September
- Area affected: Belgium, United Kingdom
- Date of impact: 23 – 26 September 2020

== Other systems ==
On 29 September, a moderate storm named Mortimer by FUB moved across central Europe and killed three people.

In late October 2019, a medicane formed far east in the Mediterranean Sea. It affected Cyprus, Israel and Egypt. The storm formed in the far east of the sea, something which is not seen often.

On 10–11 December, an explosively deepening storm affected Iceland, where the meteorological office declared its first red warning for parts of the country. The system was named Siro by the Free University of Berlin. The storm dropped to a pressure of 949 mbar (28.0 inHg), bringing strong winds and blizzard conditions, causing a complete halt to transportation and power loss to 20,000. The storm was described by Icelandic meteorologists as a once in a decade event.

On 15 January the extreme weather event Didrik hit the southern coast of Norway with high coastal waters. This weather event was caused by Storm Brendan, which for a longer period had stalled south east of Iceland, and a secondary low named Gerlinde by the Free University of Berlin. Storm Brendan had for a longer period pushed water towards the coast of Norway bringing high coastal waters already from 13 January. Gerlinde was expected to bring even higher water levels. Due to these two low pressure areas, combined with full moon 10 January, the Norwegian Meteorological Institute named the event Didrik. Gerlinde moved quicker than expected over southern Norway and brought lower water levels to the southern coast, but Brendan however moved towards the coast more powerful than expected and brought higher water levels on the western coast. The weather event made damage to many buildings along the coast as well as disrupt railway services due to flooding.

On 28 January, Storm Lolita, named by FUB, caused two deaths in Germany.

On 14 February, a rapidly deepening low in the Atlantic affected Iceland, named Uta by the Free University of Berlin. Red wind warnings for the south of Iceland were issued with reports of coastal flooding around the Reykjanes peninsula.

On 22 February storm Tuuli, named by the Finnish Meteorological Institute, hit Finland.

On 27 February Bianca (FUB) affected France, Switzerland and Germany.

On 12 March storm Laura hit Denmark and southern Sweden. It was named Laura by the Danish Meteorological Institute, and known as Hanna by the Free University of Berlin. In Sweden winds gusts of up to 136 km/h (85 mph; 73.5 kn; 37.8 m/s) was recorded. Strong winds cut the power to more than 20,000 people, and also closed the Öresund bridge.

On 25 July a storm hit the eastern parts of Finland. Despite its severity it was only unofficially named Uuno by the Finnish media. Strong winds caused trees to fall over electrical lines cutting power to more than 3,000 people. The damages to forests was estimated to cost between 2 and 3 million euros.

On 30 July another storm hit Finland. This was more powerful and was officially named Päivö by the Finnish Meteorological Institute.

== Season effects ==
Storm	Dates active	Highest wind gust	Lowest pressure	Fatalities (+missing)	Damage	Affected areas
Lorenzo	2–4 October	107 km/h (66 mph; 58 kn)	966 mbar (28.5 inHg)	11 (+7)	£283 million (€336 million)	Azores, Eastern United States (while a hurricane), Ireland, United Kingdom
Amélie	1–4 November	189 km/h (117 mph; 102 kn)	972 mbar (28.7 inHg)	1	£80 million (€90 million)	France, Spain, Italy
Bernardo	10–11 November	111 km/h (69 mph; 60 kn)	996 mbar (29.4 inHg)	1	—	Spain, Algeria
Cecilia	16–29 November	163 km/h (101 mph; 88 kn)	974 mbar (28.8 inHg)	0	—	Spain
Sebastien	24 November–1 December	80 km/h (50 mph; 43 kn)	980 mbar (29 inHg)	0	—	Ireland, United Kingdom
Atiyah	4–9 December	150.1 km/h (93.3 mph; 81.0 kn)	956 mbar (28.2 inHg)	0	£40 million (€48 million)	Ireland, United Kingdom, Netherlands, France
Daniel	15–20 December	135 km/h (84 mph; 73 kn)	982 mbar (29.0 inHg)	0	—	Portugal, Spain
Elsa	13–20 December	168 km/h (104 mph; 91 kn)	961 mbar (28.4 inHg)	8	£170 million (€200 million)	Portugal, Spain, France, United Kingdom, Ireland, Norway
Fabien	16–23 December	206 km/h (128 mph; 111 kn)	963 mbar (28.4 inHg)	0	£170 million (€200 million)	Portugal, Spain, France
Brendan	11–17 January	182 km/h (113 mph; 98 kn)	940 mbar (27.8 inHg)	1	£2 million (€2.3 million)	Ireland, United Kingdom, Belgium, Netherlands, Spain, France
Gloria	15–20 January	133 km/h (83 mph; 72 kn)	993 mbar (29.3 inHg)	14 (+3)	£150 million (€180 million)	Portugal, Spain
Hervé	3–6 February	195 km/h (121 mph; 105 kn)	990 mbar (29.2 inHg)	3	—	France, Austria, Switzerland, Czech Republic, Germany
Ciara	4–12 February	219 km/h (136 mph; 118 kn)	943 mbar (27.8 inHg)	18	To be confirmed	Ireland, United Kingdom, Belgium, The Netherlands, Germany
Inès	11–14 February	132 km/h (82 mph; 71 kn)	976 mbar (28.8 inHg)	0	—	France
Dennis	12–20 February	230 km/h (140 mph; 120 kn)	920 mbar (27 inHg)	6 (+1)	To be confirmed	Ireland, United Kingdom, Belgium, The Netherlands, Germany
Jorge	25 February–5 March	–	952 mbar (28.1 inHg)	0	–	United Kingdom, Ireland, Iceland
Karine	2–4 March	–	984 mbar (29.1 inHg)	0	–	France, Spain, Italy
Leon	29 February–1 March	–	990 mbar (29.2 inHg)	0	–	Spain, France, Belgium
Myriam	29 February–5 March	–	992 mbar (29.3 inHg)	0	–	Spain, France, Corsica, Malta, Italy
Norberto	3–7 March	–	982 mbar (29.0 inHg)	0	–	France, Germany
Ellen	18 – 27 August	143 km/h (89 mph; 77 kn)	966.4 mbar (28.54 inHg)	4	–	Ireland, United Kingdom, Portugal
Francis	24 – 27 August	160 km/h (100 mph; 87 kn)	979 mbar (28.9 inHg)	–	–	Ireland, United Kingdom, The Netherlands
Odette	23 – 26 September	–	–	–	–	Belgium, United Kingdom
22 windstorms	2 October – 26 September	230.0 km/h (142.9 mph; 124.2 kn)	920 mbar (27.2 inHg)	74 (+12)	£895 million (€1.06 billion)	

== Coordination of storms named by European meteorological services ==
2019–20 named storms table (dates of impact (when warnings are issued for, not duration))
Mortimer (FUB), 29 September 2019.
ex-Lorenzo (NHC), 2–4 October 2019.
Amélie (FrEsPtBe), Arne (FUB) 2–3 November 2019.
Bernardo (FrEsPtBe), Detlef (Note: On 10 November 2019 analysis, this system was known as Detlef II.) (FUB) 9–11 November 2019, a Mediterranean storm.
Cecilia (FrEsPtBe), Luis (FUB) 22–23 November 2019.
Atiyah (IEUKNL), Rudi (FUB) 8–9 December 2019.
Siro (FUB), 10–11 December 2019.
Daniel (FrEsPtBe), Xander (FUB) 16 December 2019.
Elsa (FrEsPtBe), Yadid (FUB), 17–18 December 2019.
Fabien (FrEsPtBe), Ailton (FUB) 21–22 December 2019.
Brendan (IEUKNL), Fenja (FUB) 13 January 2020.
Didrik (No) [for high coastal water levels], combination of Brendan and secondary low (IEUKNL), Gerlinde and Fenja (FUB), 14–15 January 2020.
Gloria (FrEsPtBe), Ilka (FUB) 19–23 January 2020, a Mediterranean storm.
Lolita (FUB), 28 January 2020.
Hervé (FrEsPtBe), Petra (FUB), 4–5 February 2020.
Ciara (IEUKNL), Sabine (FUB), Elsa (No) [for high coastal water levels], 8–10 February 2020.
Inès (FrEsPtBe), Tomris (FUB) 13 February 2020.
Uta (FUB), 14 February 2020.
Dennis (IEUKNL), Victoria (FUB), 15–17 February 2020.
Tuuli (Fi), Xanthippe III (FUB), 22 February 2020.
Bianca (FUB), 27 February 2020.
Jorge (FrEsPtBe), Charlotte (FUB), 29 February–1 March 2020.
Karine (FrESPtBe), Diana III (FUB), 2 March 2020.
Leon (FrEsPtBe), Diana II (FUB) 1 March 2020.
Myriam (FrEsPtBe), 3 March 2020.
Norberto (FrEsPtBe), Elli (FUB), 5 March 2020.
Laura (dk), Hanna (FUB), 12 March 2020.
Uuno (Fi), Quiola? (FUB), 25 June 2020.
Päivö (Fi), Ulrike (FUB), 30 June–1 July 2020.
Ellen (IEUKNL), 19–20 August 2020.
Francis (IEUKNL), Kirsten (FUB), 25—26 August 2020.
Odette (FrEsPtBe), Wicca (FUB) 25 September 2020.
