= 2019–20 North American winter =

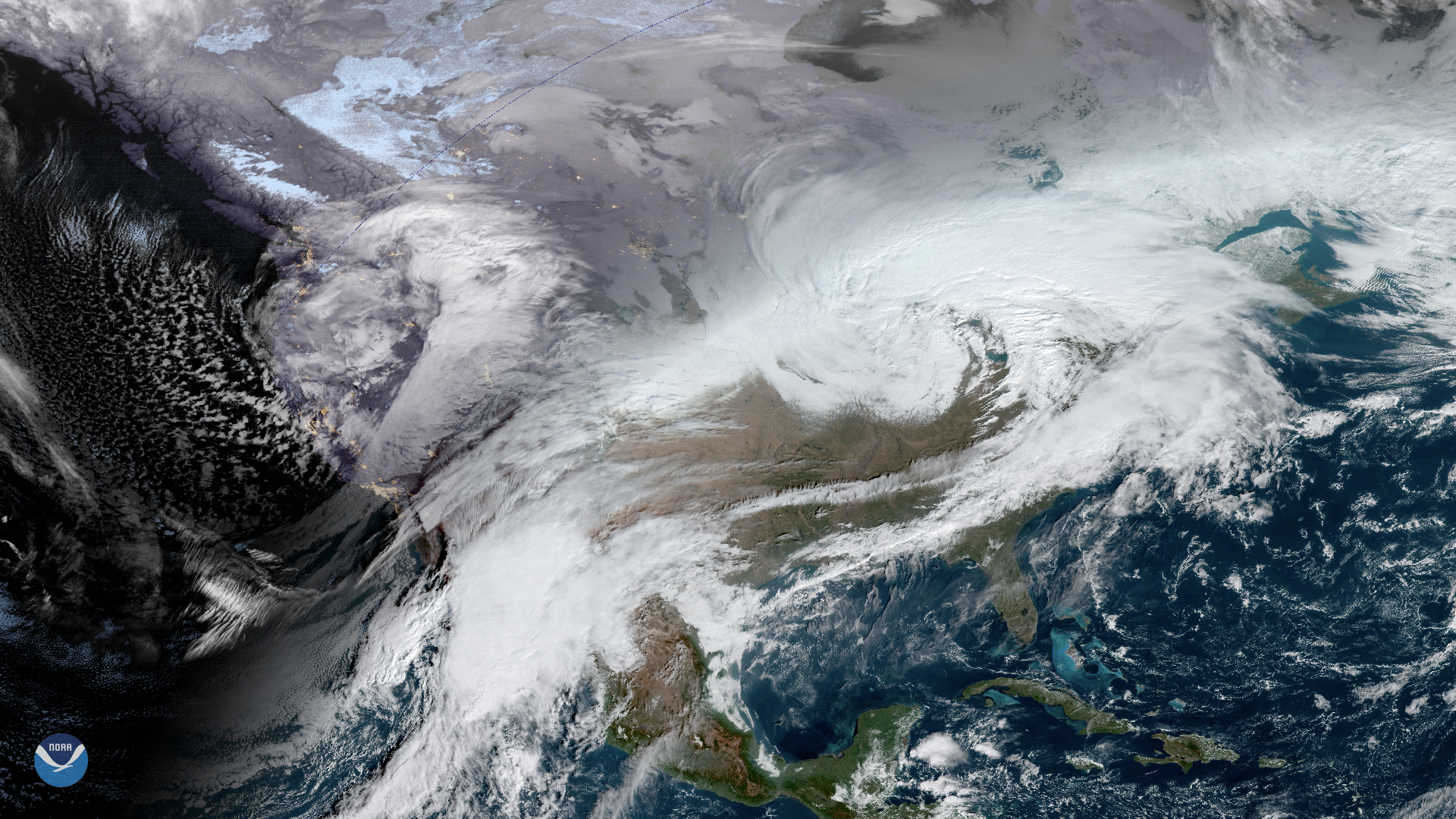
- Winter storms over the US and Canada on November 27, 2019

Seasonal boundaries
- Meteorological winter: December 1 – February 29
- Astronomical winter: December 21 – March 19
- First event started: September 27, 2019
- Last event concluded: April 18, 2020

Most notable event
- Name: November 26 – December 3, 2019 North American blizzard
  - Duration: November 26–December 3, 2019
  - Lowest pressure: 973.4 mb (28.74 inHg)
  - Fatalities: 8 fatalities
  - Damage: $200 million (2020 USD)

Seasonal statistics
- Total WPC-issued storms: 12 total
- Rated storms (RSI) (Cat. 1+): 1 total (record low)
- Major storms (RSI) (Cat. 3+): 0 total
- Maximum snowfall accumulation: 114 in (290 cm) in Homewood, California (March 18–22, 2020)
- Maximum ice accretion: 1.25 in (32 mm) in Lawrence, Kansas (March 14–18, 2020)
- Total fatalities: 65 total
- Total damage: ≥ $200 million (2020 USD)

Related articles
- 2019–20 European windstorm season

The 2019–20 North American winter was unusually warm for many parts of the United States; in many areas, neutral ENSO conditions controlled the weather patterns, resulting in strong El Niño like conditions and the sixth-warmest winter on record, and many areas in the Northeastern United States saw one of the least snowy winters in years. In fact, Baltimore and Islip saw no snow in February for the first time. Some notable events still occurred, such as a powerful blizzard that impacted the Western United States in late November, a series of cold shots in January and February, a snowstorm within the Texas Panhandle and a late-season blizzard in the High Plains.

While there is no well-agreed-upon date used to indicate the start of winter in the Northern Hemisphere, there are two definitions of winter which may be used. Based on the astronomical definition, winter begins at the winter solstice, which in 2019 occurred on December 21, and ends at the March equinox, which in 2020 occurred on March 19. Based on the meteorological definition, the first day of winter is December 1 and the last day February 29. Both definitions involve a period of approximately three months, with some variability. Winter is often defined by meteorologists to be the three calendar months with the lowest average temperatures. Since both definitions span the calendar year, it is possible to have a winter storm spanning two different years.

== Seasonal forecasts ==
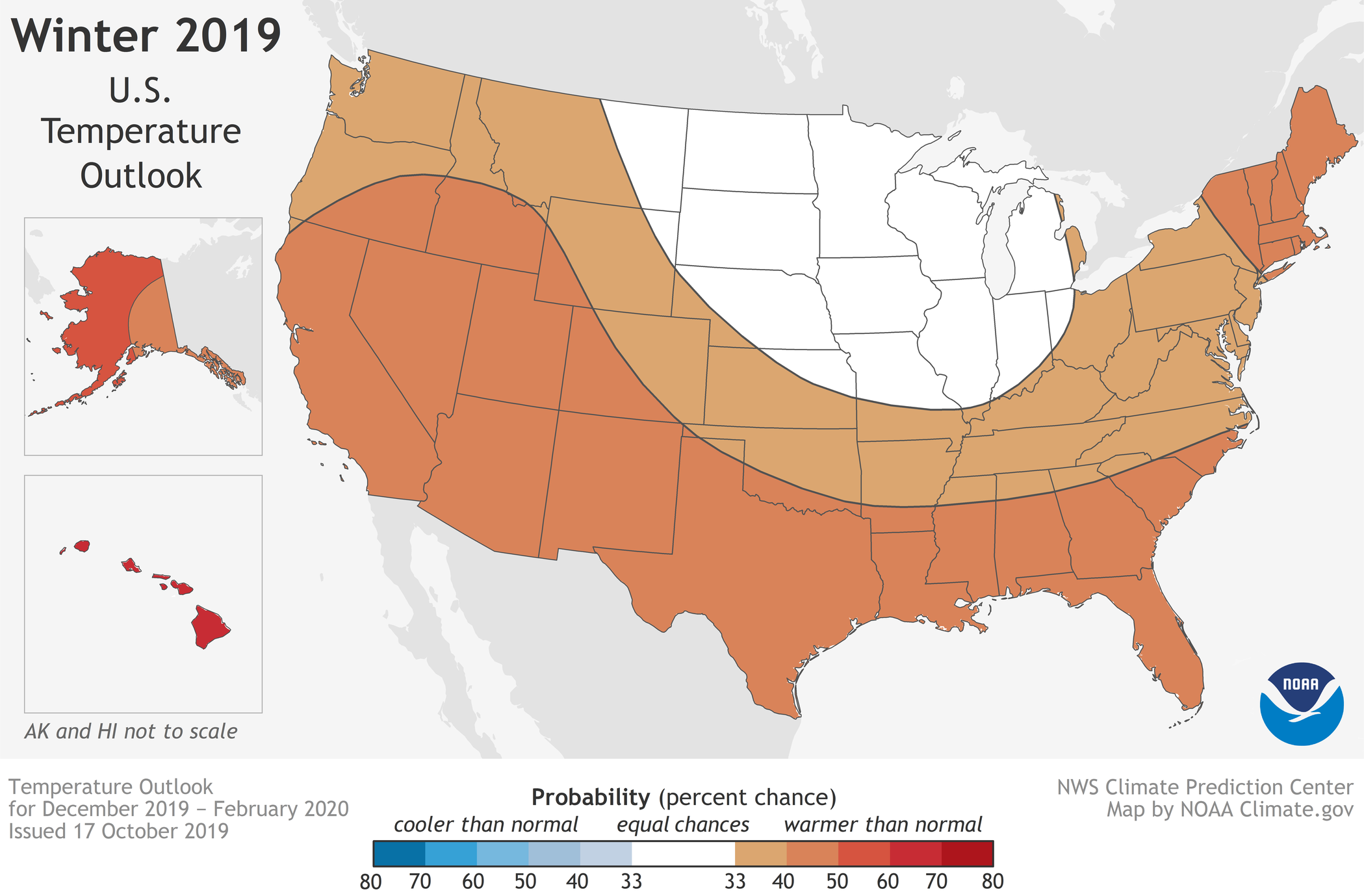
Temperature outlook

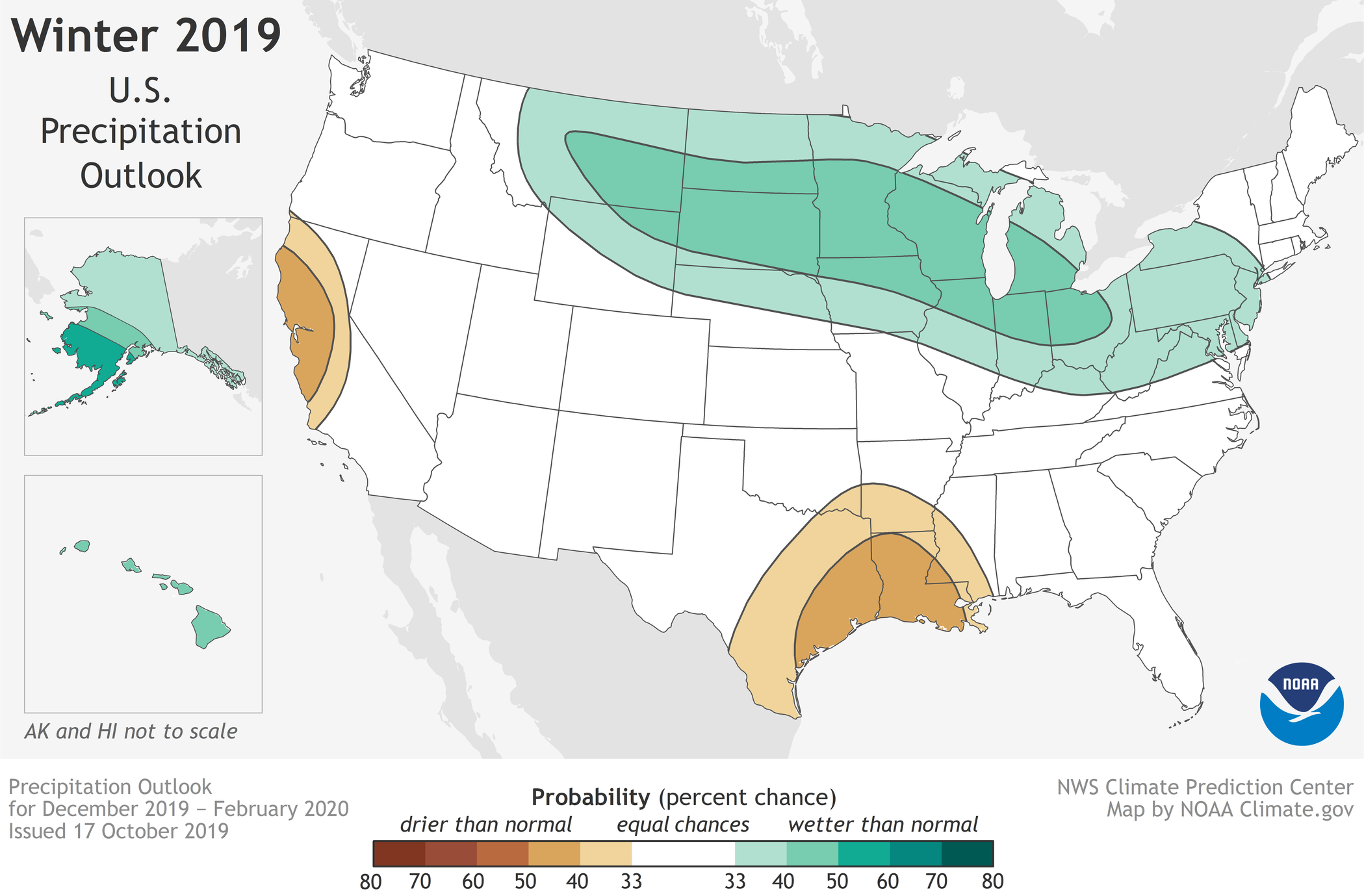
Precipitation outlook

On October 17, 2019, the National Oceanic and Atmospheric Administration's Climate Prediction Center released its U.S. Winter Outlook. The El Niño–Southern Oscillation was in its neutral phase and was thus not expected to be a key predictor for the season. As a result, other oscillations such as the Madden–Julian Oscillation and the Arctic Oscillation were anticipated to be more significant drivers of the seasonal weather, particularly in the form of large temperature and precipitation swings. From the outlook, the greatest likelihoods for above-normal temperatures were for Alaska and Hawaii, with lower but still above-normal odds of above-average temperatures for most of the lower 48 states. The exception was for the Northern Plains, Upper Mississippi Valley, and western Great Lakes regions, which were ascribed equal changes for above-, near-, or below-average temperatures. No area in the United States was favored to have below-average temperatures. In terms of precipitation, wetter-than-average conditions were most likely in Alaska, Hawaii, part of the Northern Plains, Upper Mississippi Valley, Great Lakes, and parts of the Mid-Atlantic and Northeastern U.S. Drier-than-average conditions were favored for Louisiana and parts of Texas, Mississippi, Arkansas, and Oklahoma, as well as parts of central and northern California, with the rest of the U.S. having equal changes of above-, near-, or below-average precipitation. The drought outlook highlighted the presence of abnormally dry conditions across much of the Southern U.S., with improvement expected in part of the Southeast and Mid-Atlantic regions, Alaska, and Hawaii. Drought was expected to persist in central Texas and the Southwestern U.S., with further development anticipated in parts of central California.

== Events ==
=== Late September winter storm ===
An unusually early winter storm blanketed parts of the northern Rockies at the end of September 2019. Great Falls, Montana recorded 19.3 in (49 cm) of snow on September 28 and 29th, which is the largest September storm on record in the region and the second largest two day storm on record there, behind April 27–28, 2009. Missoula also saw their heaviest September snow on record. Wind gusts reached as high as 60 miles per hour (97 km/h). Browning, Montana received 48 in (120 cm) of snow. Spokane, Washington saw their earliest snow in over 100 years and their snowiest September as well, with record cold highs as well on September 29, with Spokane only reaching 38 °F (3 °C). Portland, Oregon tied their all time record low high in September, which was 50 °F (10 °C) in downtown and 52 °F (11 °C) at Portland International Airport. The University of Lethbridge was forced to cancel classes due to 50 cm (20 in) of snow. Several roads in Glacier National Park were also closed. In Calgary, the snowfall total of 24.6 cm (9.7 in) on September 29 made that the snowiest September day in history there. Then-governor Steve Bullock of Montana declared a state of emergency following the storm.

=== Early November cold wave ===
Record breaking temperatures and snowfall caused disruption throughout the Midwestern United States in early November. Approximately 1000 flights were grounded at Chicago's O'Hare International Airport as 3.7 inches (9.4 cm) of snow fell on November 11, breaking the previous daily record of 1.9 inches (4.8 cm) on November 11, 1995. On November 12, Chicago set records for a record cold low (7 °F (−14 °C)) and high (17 °F (−8 °C)). That was the coldest so early in the season. In areas of Michigan's lower peninsula, over 2 feet (61 cm) of snow fell. The 9.2 in (23 cm) of snow in Detroit made this the largest November snowstorm for the city. Parts of Texas saw feels like temperatures drop from 92 °F (33 °C) to 31 °F (−1 °C) as the arctic blast moved through. In Canada, Southern Ontario and Southern Quebec had their first major winter storm of the season on November 11 and 12 respectively, which was followed by record, January-like cold. 10–20 centimetres (3.9–7.9 in) of snow fell across much of the region crippling large cities such as Montreal and Toronto. In Montreal, local officials announced the city's earliest ever snow removal operation in the aftermath of the storm. Over 10 school boards province-wide closed the day after the storm. Paducah, Kentucky saw their earliest in-season sub-freezing high. Lexington, Kentucky established a new record low of 12 °F (−11 °C). In New York City, the air was considered cold even by January standards, as November 12 saw a record low temperature of 25 °F (−4 °C), and November 13 also saw a record cold low of 23 °F (−5 °C), and a high of only 34 °F (1 °C). The high on November 13 was well below the average low of 42 °F (6 °C). Pittsburgh saw a new record low temperature of 12 °F (−11 °C), breaking the previous record from 1911. In the Lehigh Valley, temperatures tied a record low of 18 °F (−8 °C) and the high of 35 °F (2 °C) became a record cold high. In Toronto, a record low on November 12 was established at −7.9 °C (17.8 °F), and on November 13, a new record low of −11.2 °C (11.8 °F) was established. This forced Toronto to give an extreme cold alert. It got as cold as 17 °F (−8 °C) in Mississippi, causing sea smoke off the Gulf of Mexico. Watertown, New York tied their monthly record of −7 °F (−22 °C) that was previously set the previous winter, while breaking the daily record by 18 °F (10 °C). Some places, like Pensacola, which plunged to 30 °F (−1 °C), had a day colder than any day the previous winter. The cold wave also killed six people, and another winter storm related death occurred in Michigan. Before the arctic blast, it was unseasonably warm in certain places. In Great Falls, Montana, the high on November 9 was 60 °F (16 °C), but by noon on November 10, it dropped to 14 °F (−10 °C). Due to the cold wave, several locations in Illinois, Indiana and Michigan saw a record cold first half of November, with average highs hovering around freezing.

=== Late November–early December blizzard ===
- Category 2 "Significant" (RSI/NOAA: 3.608)
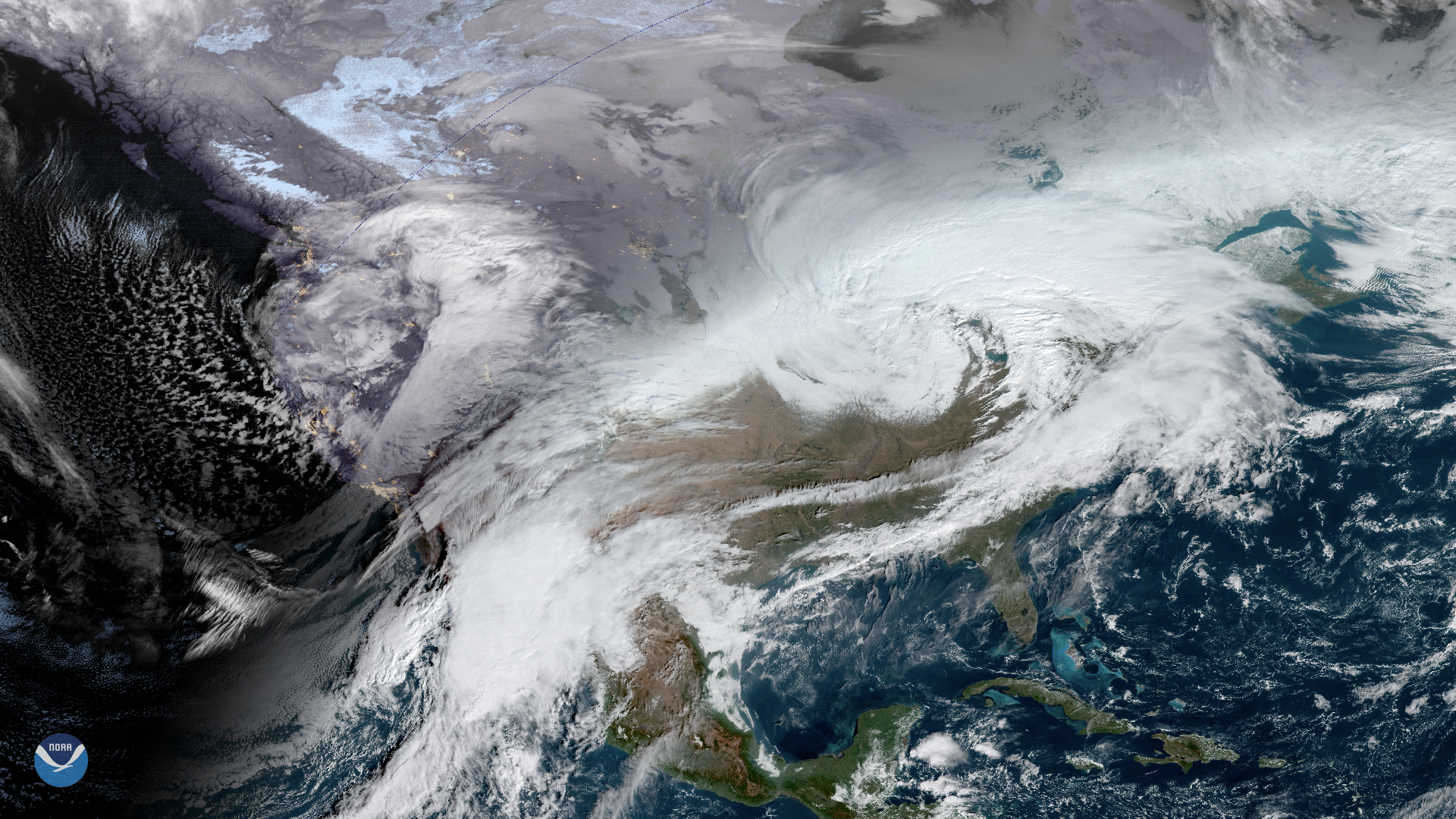
- Duration: November 26 – December 3, 2019
- Lowest pressure: 973.4 mb (28.74 inHg)
- Maximum snow: 36 in (91 cm)
- Fatalities: 8 fatalities
- Damage: $200 million (2019 USD)

Moving ashore November 26–27 near the border between Oregon and California as an over-achieving bomb cyclone, it produced wind gusts in excess of 100 mph (160 km/h) near its point of landfall. The storm produced a record low pressure reading of 973.4 millibars (28.74 inHg) in Crescent City, California. From November 27–30, the low merged with the subtropical jet stream as it tracked slowly eastward across the Rockies, Great Plains and Midwest. The combination of cold air, moisture and high winds produced a wide swath of blizzard conditions from Colorado through western South Dakota, including the Denver metropolitan area. In Rapid City, South Dakota, 14.5 in (37 cm) of snow fell on the 30th, breaking the one-day snowfall record for November. In Duluth, Minnesota, where 21.7 in (55 cm) of snow accumulated, it was the city's heaviest snowstorm in 10 years. As the first major winter storm of the season in the northeast, it dumped 22.6 in (57 cm) of snow in Albany, New York, where it was the heaviest snowfall since the 1993 Superstorm. Widespread totals in excess of 20 inches occurred in the Albany metropolitan area, southern New Hampshire, and northwestern Massachusetts with a regional peak of 36 in (91 cm) of snow in New Ipswich, New Hampshire. The low finally moved out to sea December 3.

=== January storm complexes ===
==== First storm (January 8–10) ====
A large complex of low pressure systems began developing January 9 over Central North America. A large trough dug into the jet stream over the Southwestern United States, providing arctic air that had been settled over Canada to move southwards and clash with warm, moist air moving northward from the Gulf of Mexico. In the warm sector, severe thunderstorms and tornadoes broke out in the south central United States on the morning of January 10. Tornado warnings were issued for more than 1.7 million in the Dallas-Fort Worth metropolitan area, an at 7:52 pm CST a PDS tornado warning was issued for Scranton, Arkansas and surrounding communities. More than 111,000 customers were left without power in Texas alone. Severe weather continued in the deep south into following day, with Alabama being affected particularly severely. North of the boundary, a mix of heavy snow and freezing rain caused travel problems across the Midwest. Along the Great Lakes, winds were forecast to whip up 23 ft (7.0 m) waves as lakeshore flooding had already begun in Chicago. Central Michigan through Eastern Ontario received a swath of crippling ice accretion. Several January rainfall records fell in Southern Ontario, as event rainfall totals over 50 mm (2.0 in) were widespread.

==== Second storm (January 14–18) ====
- Category 0 "Nuisance" (RSI/NOAA: N/A)
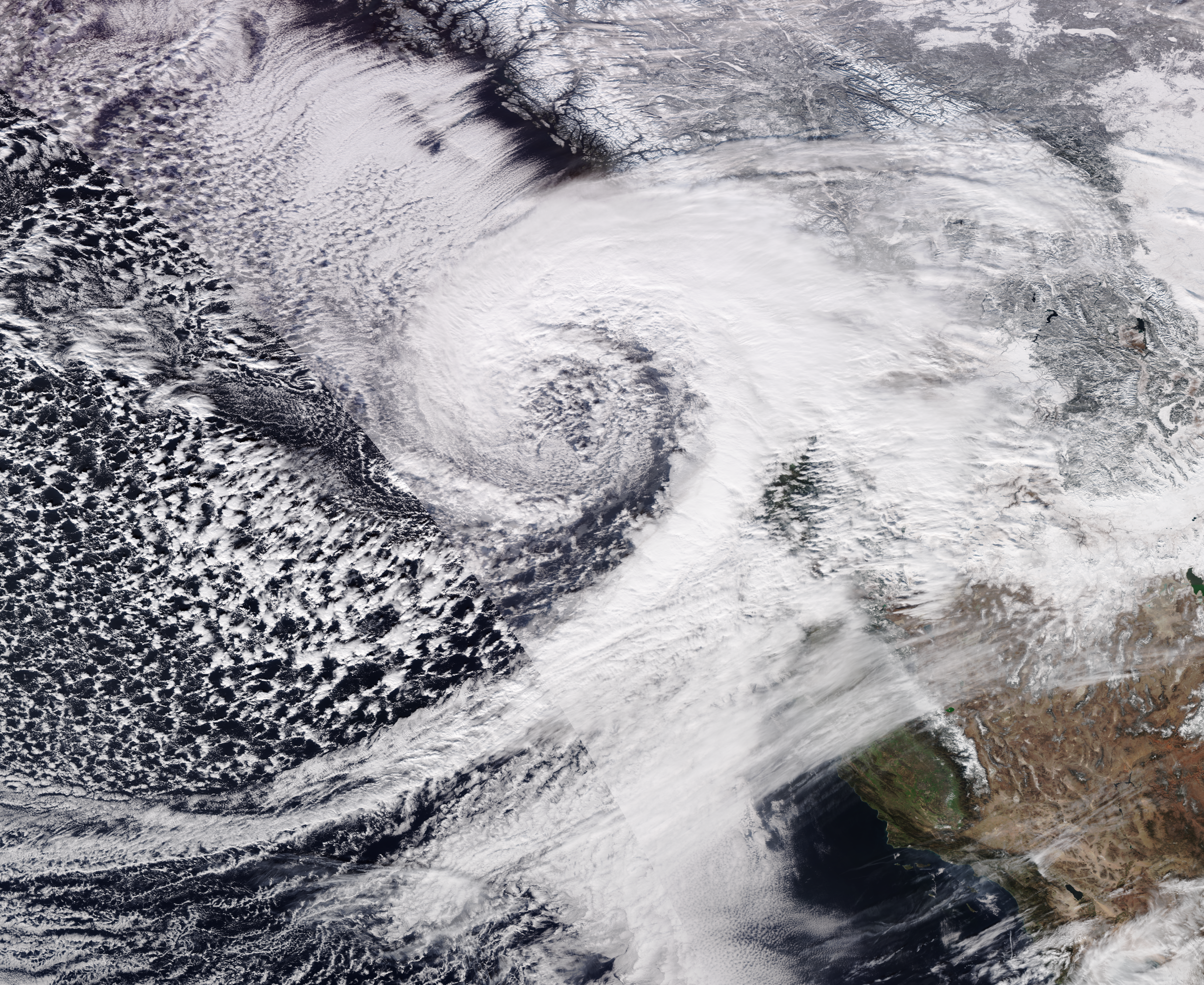
- Duration: January 14 – 18, 2020
- Lowest pressure: 979 mb (28.91 inHg)
- Maximum snow: 37 in (94 cm)
- Fatalities: 2 fatalities

In mid-January 2020, a complex system of winter storms that crossed North America, bringing heavy snowfall and high winds to Atlantic Canada and the northern United States between 15 and 18 January. At least one person was killed, in California, while at least one went missing, in Newfoundland. The person who went missing in Newfoundland was later found dead. Another two people died in Newfoundland after shoveling snow, although the connection to the storm is unclear. The winter storm caused historic blizzard conditions in many areas, particularly Atlantic Canada.

=== January–February cold waves ===
A major arctic outbreak affected western Canada and the Pacific Northwest from January 12–19. Extreme cold warnings were issued across all of Alberta, Yukon, the Northwest Territories, most of British Columbia, most of Saskatchewan and part of Manitoba during this period, as a cross-polar flow caused arctic air to settle in the region. Much of Central Alberta dipped below −40 °C (−40 °F), colder than it was in Siberia at the time. Chilcotin, British Columbia saw temperatures as low as −48.5 °C (−55.3 °F).

Following the storm that would go on to become the North Atlantic bomb cyclone, the Ohio River Valley area and parts of the Midwest suffered brutally cold temperatures on January 19. On January 19, Southern New England experienced a flash freeze as a sleet storm impacted central and northern Massachusetts.

On February 14, the Ohio Valley region suffered brutally cold temperatures again this winter with temperatures plummeting to a low of −2 °F (−19 °C) at Chicago O'Hare International Airport, regionally the coldest temperatures recorded in the 2019–2020 season. Considering the windchill factor, temperatures ranged from −10 °F (−23 °C) to −20 °F (−29 °C); dangerously cold for anyone outdoors. It was Chicago's coldest Valentine's Day in 77 years. Temperatures in Minnesota were also record breaking; an overnight low of −35 °F (−37 °C) was reported at Preston. New Hampton, Iowa broke a near-century old record when they fell to −18 °F (−28 °C). Temperatures in High Point, New Jersey fell to 1 °F (−17 °C) on February 15. North of the international border, temperatures fell into the −20 °C (−4 °F) range as far south as Toronto, where several frostquakes occurred.

=== Early February winter storm ===
- Category 0 "Nuisance" (RSI/NOAA: N/A)
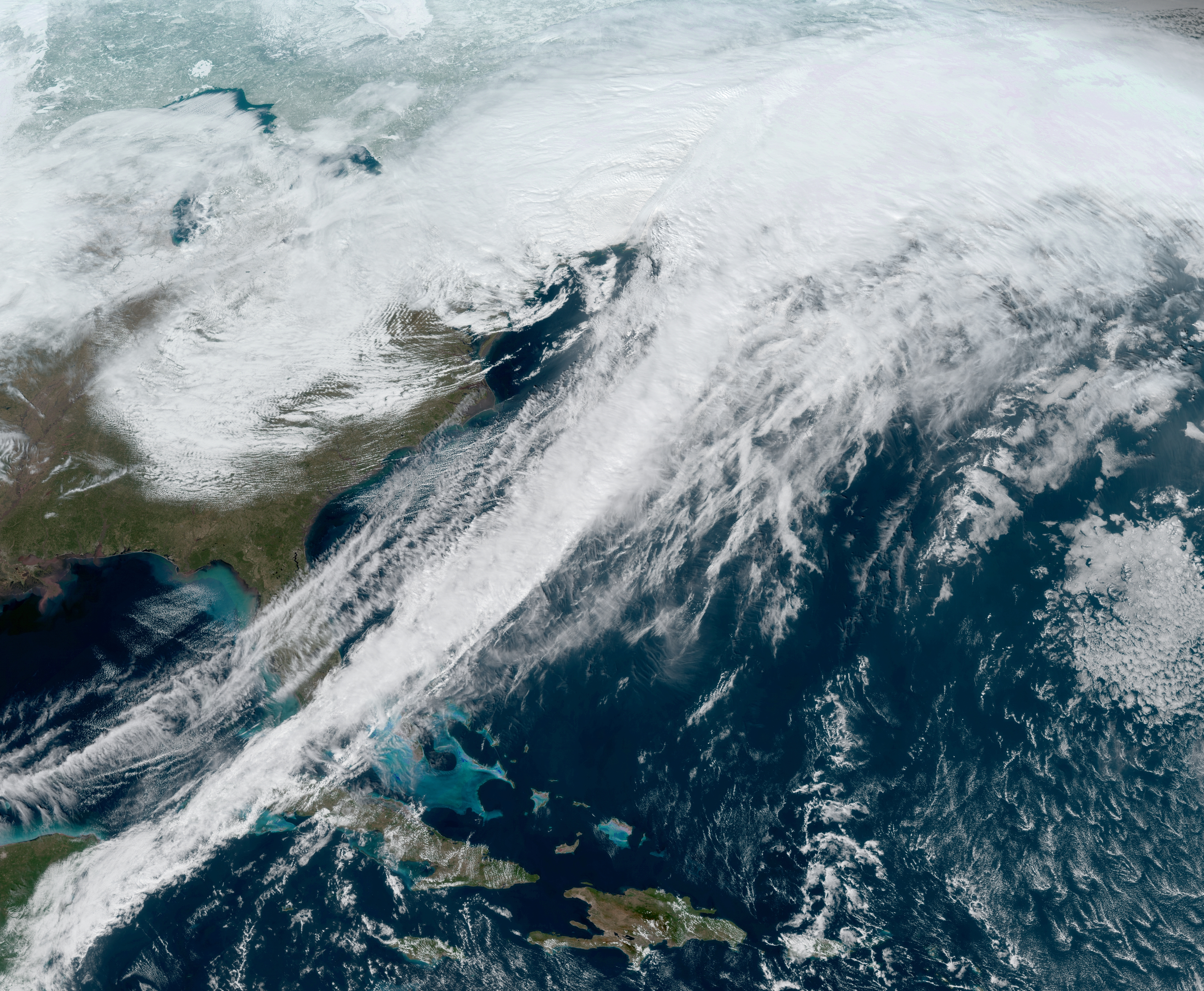
- Duration: February 3 – February 8, 2020
- Lowest pressure: 980 mb (28.94 inHg)
- Maximum snow: 23.5 in (60 cm)
- Fatalities: 17 fatalities

On February 4 and 5, snow fell in the deep south, primarily in Texas and Oklahoma, where several highways were closed. Snow fell as far south as Austin, 14 in (36 cm) of snow fell in Jayton, Texas, and thundersnow occurred in Big Spring. Interstate 70 in central Missouri was temporarily shut down as road crews cleaned debris in the aftermath of a collision. Schools closed in portions of Texas, Oklahoma and Missouri. 9,000 were left without power in the Oklahoma City metropolitan area. The following day, severe thunderstorms produced flash flooding and tornadoes in the Southeastern United States. In Simpson County, Mississippi, a possible-tornado destroyed several mobile homes. A PDS tornado warning was issued for Charlotte, where those at the airport were relocated to the building's interior. Severe thunderstorms and tornado warnings occurred as far North as Maryland and Delaware. Winter weather advisories were issued from Tennessee to Maine, with warnings concentrated over north-central Pennsylvania, Western New York, and portions of Northern New England. With a precipitation shield of 2,500 kilometres (1,600 miles) the storm impacted 16 million across 6 provinces in Canada. The storm was dubbed "Winter Storm Kade" by The Weather Channel.

=== Mid February Southeast U.S snowstorm ===
A broad area of low pressure brought snow to parts of the Southeast beginning on February 19, when snow began to fall in the mountains of Tennessee. 4.2 inches (11 cm) and 4 inches (10 cm) of snow accumulated in Waynesville and Mount Leconte, respectively. Similar but slightly lesser amounts occurred in surrounding areas of eastern Tennessee and western North Carolina. Another swath of snow occurred in eastern North Carolina and southeastern Virginia on February 20–21, ending a 400+ day snow-free streak in the region. In preparation for the storm, most school boards closed or had delayed openings, hundreds of flights were cancelled and all of North Carolina was put under a Winter weather advisory. The winter storm was named Winter Storm Nash by The Weather Channel.

=== Mid-March blizzard ===
- Category 0 "Nuisance" (RSI/NOAA: N/A)
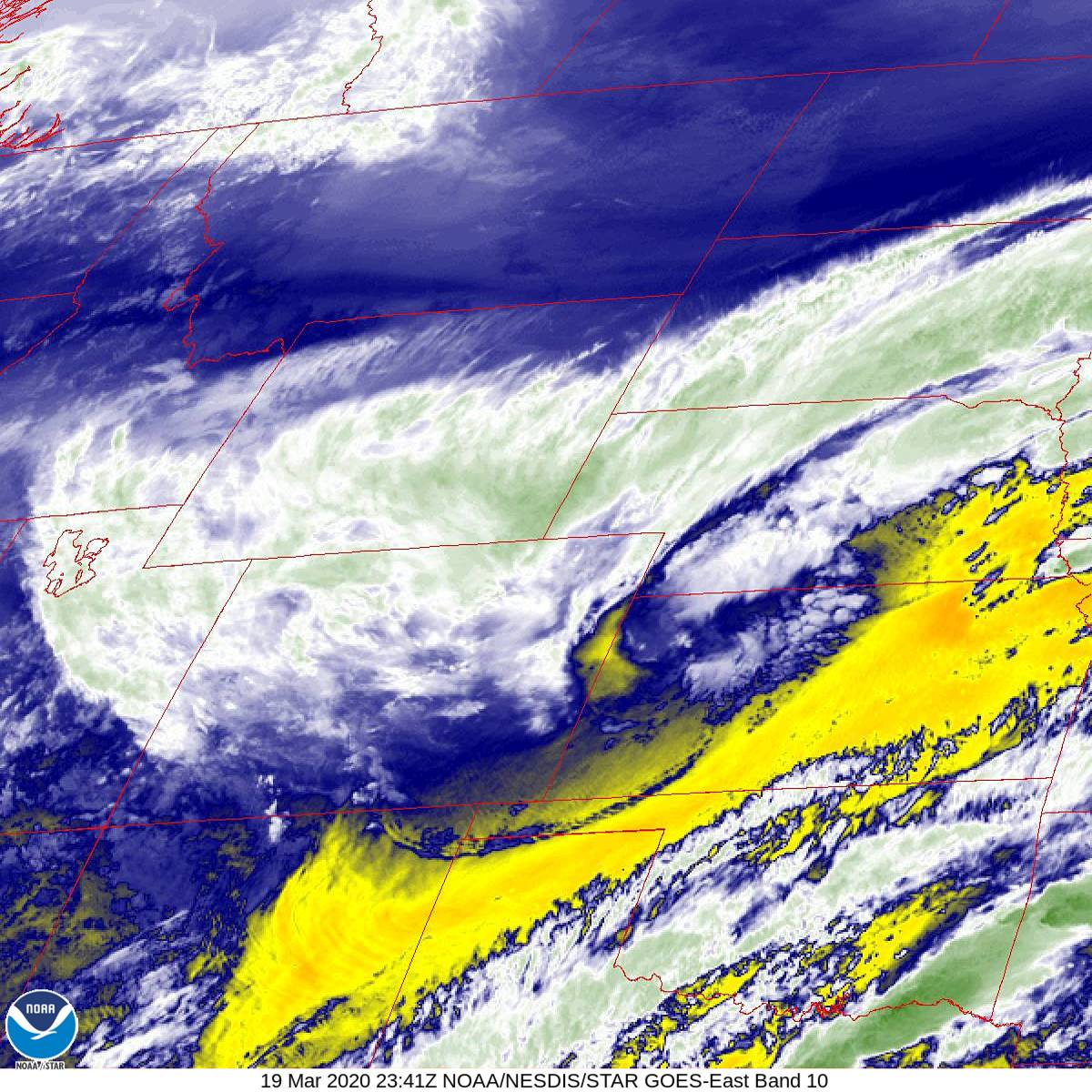
- Duration: March 18 – March 22, 2020
- Maximum snow: 114 in (290 cm)

An area of low pressure incoming from the Pacific drifted down the California coastline the week of March 16, bringing scattered thunderstorms with hail to Southern California. Continuous flow of moisture into California's mountains produced extreme snowfall totals during an otherwise unimpressive winter there. 114 inches (290 cm) of snow fell at Homewood, 92 inches (230 cm) at Sierra-at-Tahoe and 77 inches (200 cm) at Kingvale. Several rounds of severe thunderstorms occurred in Texas during this time period with the Dallas metropolitan area being especially hit hard. Following over 4 inches (10 cm) of rain, street flooding was reported. The responsible low pressure area was observed to finally move ashore mid-day on the 18, and the Colorado low began forming shortly afterward. In the Rocky Mountains and Great Plains, blizzard warnings were issued March 17 in anticipation of a very heavy snowfall to be accompanied by strong winds. Snowfall totals in NWS Boulder's forecast region peak at 23 inches (58 cm), 4 miles (6.4 km) NE of Nederland. Combined with winds gusting over 62 miles per hour (100 km/h), widespread blizzard conditions occurred. At Denver's airport over 1,000 flights or around 80% of air traffic that day, were cancelled.

=== Mid-April winter storm ===
- Category 0 "Nuisance" (RSI/NOAA: N/A)
- Duration: April 15 – April 18, 2020
- Maximum snow: 26.3 in (67 cm)

Outside the warm sector of the broad system, an unseasonable snowstorm and gale-force winds affected regions from the northern Plains into the Midwestern United States. Sioux Falls, South Dakota, recorded 5.2 in (13 cm) on April 12, a daily record and the second snowiest Easter Sunday on record. The Twin Cities recorded 5.1 in (13 cm) of snow, setting a new Easter Sunday record going back to 1891. Accumulations totaling to nearly a foot across portions of southern Minnesota caused multiple spinouts and crashes, principally along I-35 south of the Twin Cities, I-90 between Albert Lea and Rochester, and US 52 between Rochester and the Twin Cities. Traffic, though, was lighter than usual given the stay-at-home order for the ongoing COVID-19 pandemic. State patrol reported 140 crashes, 126 vehicle that spun out, and six semi-trucks that jackknifed on slippery roads. Fourteen people were injured. In Wisconsin, a band of 6–15 in (15–38 cm) accumulations fell north of a Marshfield to Wausaukee line. Daily snowfall records were set in Rochester and Eau Claire. Winds exceeding gale threshold backed up waters on the Fox and East rivers, causing minor flooding in Green Bay. In Michigan, areas of the Upper Peninsula between Marquette and Munising recorded 18–24 in (46–61 cm) of snow. Wave heights of 7.5–8.5 ft (2.3–2.6 m) were estimated on Lake Michigan.

=== Early May cold wave ===
On May 9, 2020, the Eastern United States suffered record cold. Several areas of New England saw accumulating snow, with Cambridge, Vermont seeing the peak snow of 12 inches (30 cm). New York City tied 1977 for its latest trace of snow on record. Even Islip, which went snowless in February, picked up a trace from this event, where temperatures fell to a record low 34 °F (1 °C). Elkins, West Virginia saw their snowiest day in May on record, with 1.5 in (3.8 cm) of snow on May 8. The National Weather Service Caribou, Maine was forced to issue their first ever May winter storm warning since 2005. Five thousand customers lost power due to the snow in Maine. Record lows were set as far south as Greenville, North Carolina, which dipped down to 34 °F (1 °C). Richmond, Virginia hit the freezing mark, and certain places in Virginia reached 30 °F (−1 °C). Washington DC saw a record low high of 52 °F (11 °C). Several record lows for the entire month of May were set, like Binghamton, New York (24 °F (−4 °C)), Fort Wayne, Indiana (23 °F (−5 °C)), Indianapolis (27 °F (−3 °C)), LaGuardia Airport (36 °F (2 °C)), and Jackson, Kentucky (30 °F (−1 °C)), and tied ones include State College, Pennsylvania (27 °F (−3 °C)), John F. Kennedy International Airport (34 °F (1 °C)), and London, Kentucky (28 °F (−2 °C)). Daily record lows persisted into May 12. Nashville saw their coldest 35 °F (2 °C) temperature so late in the year, breaking the previous record from 1968 by 3 days. Philadelphia saw a low of 35 °F (2 °C) and a wind chill of 23 °F (−5 °C). The high of 49 °F (9 °C) tied a record and is typical of early December. Due to Alaska experiencing a major warmup, sending the cold air east, Fairbanks hit 80 °F (27 °C) before Philadelphia reached that mark for the first time in history.

== Season effects ==
This is a table of all of the events that have occurred in the 2019–20 North American winter. It includes their duration, damage, impacted locations, and death totals. Deaths in parentheses are additional and indirect (an example of an indirect death would be a traffic accident), but were still related to that storm. All of the damage figures are in 2020 USD.

Regional snowfall index scale
C0	C1	C2	C3	C4	C5

2019–20 North American winter season statistics
Event name	Dates active	RSI category	RSI value	Highest gust mph (km/h)	Minimum pressure (mbar)	Maximum snow in (cm)	Maximum ice in (mm)	Areas affected	Damage (2020 USD)	Deaths
Late September winter storm	September 28–29	N/A	N/A	Unknown	Unknown	48 (120)	Unknown	Western United States Alberta	Unknown	0
Late November–early December blizzard	November 26–December 3	Category 2	3.608	106 (171)	973.4	36 (91)	Unknown	Western United States Southern United States Midwestern United States Northeastern United States	$200 million	8
Early January storm complex	January 9–10	N/A	N/A	Unknown	Unknown	Unknown	Unknown	Southern United States Midwestern United States Ontario	Unknown	0
Mid-January storm complex	January 14–18	N/A	N/A	106 (171)	979	37 (93)	0.6 (1.3)	Western United States Midwestern United States Southern United States Northeastern United States Atlantic Canada	Unknown	2
Early February winter storm	February 3–8	N/A	N/A	62 (100)	980	23.5 (60)	Unknown	Southern United States Northeastern United States Atlantic Canada	Unknown	17
Mid February Southeast U.S snowstorm	February 20–21	N/A	N/A	Unknown	Unknown	4.2 (11)	Unknown	Southern United States	Unknown	0
Mid-March blizzard	March 18–22	N/A	N/A	62 (100)	Unknown	114 (290)	Unknown	Western United States Southern United States	Unknown	0
Mid-April winter storm	April 15–18	N/A	N/A	Unknown	Unknown	26.3 (67)	Unknown	Midwestern United States	Unknown	38
Season aggregates
1 RSI storms	September 28 – April 18				973.4	114 (290)	1.25 (32)		≥ $200 million	65

== See also ==
- North American winter
- Winter storm
- 2019–20 European windstorm season
- Weather of 2020

Preceded by 2018–19	North American winters 2019–20	Succeeded by 2020–21
