= Weather of 2020 =

The following is a list of weather events that occurred on Earth in the year 2020.

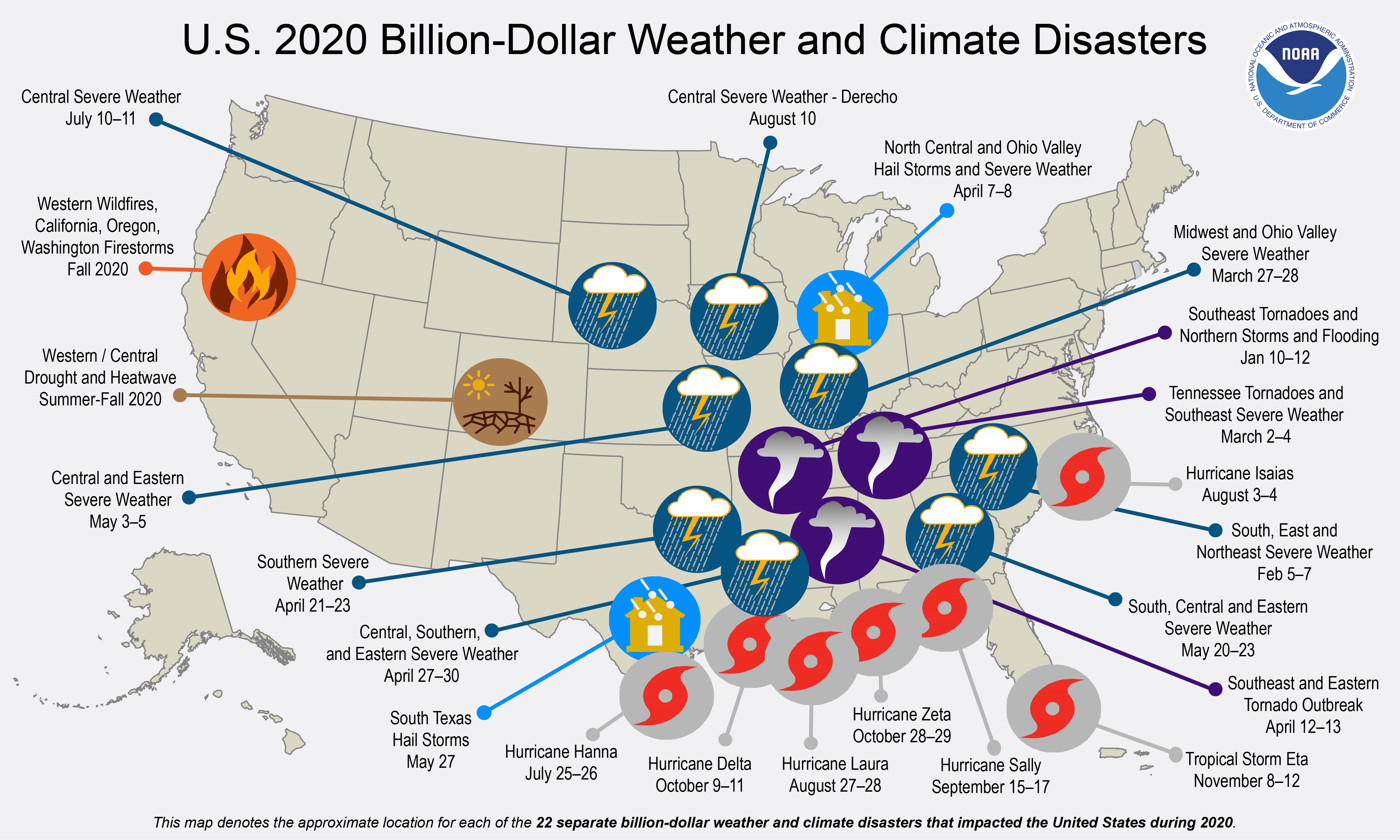
The 22 weather/climate disaster events with losses exceeding $1 billion in 2020.

== Global conditions ==
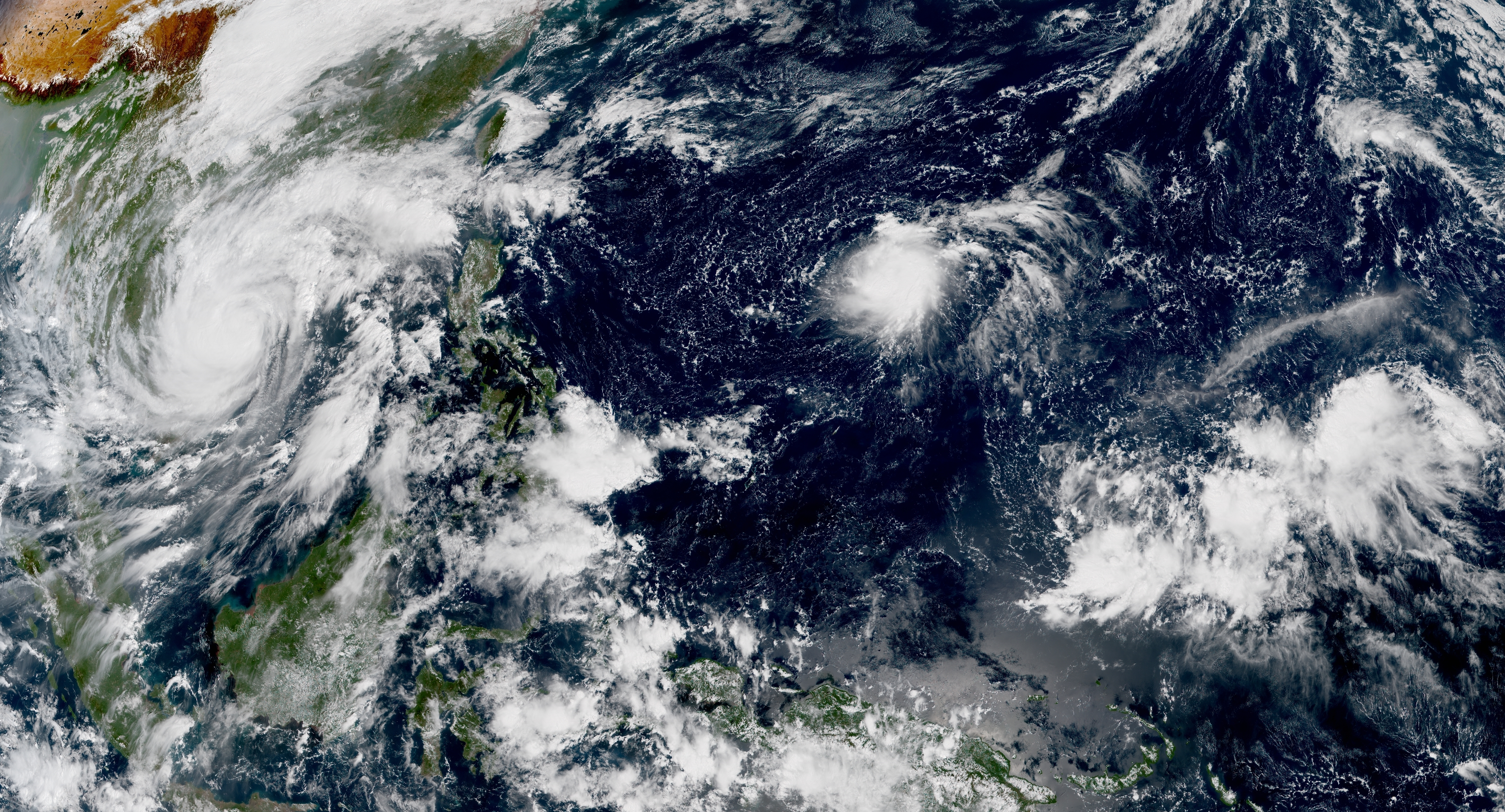
Three tropical cyclones present in the western Pacific Ocean simultaneously on October 28. From left to right: Molave, Goni, and a low-pressure area which later became Atsani (at bottom-right).

As 2020 began, sea surface temperatures were above normal in the eastern Pacific Ocean near the equator, which had the potential to develop into El Niño conditions. On January 9, a group of climate scientists writing for ENSO Blog published their forecast for atmospheric conditions. They believed that there was a 60% chance that the environment would remain in neutral conditions related to the El Niño–Southern Oscillation (ENSO); this was based on the expectation that the above normal water temperatures would return to normal. By March, there was little evidence of increased rainfall near the equator. Trade winds were enhanced in the central and tropical Pacific Ocean, and water temperatures remained above normal. On April 9, ENSO Blog reaffirmed their belief that environmental conditions would remain neutral. However, the sea surface temperatures near the equatorial pacific began to cool well below average, indicating a developing La Niña. As a result, the ENSO Blog issued La Niña watch, stating a 50–55% chance of a strong La Niña. In September, NOAA confirmed that the environment shifted to a La Niña pattern, based on lower than normal water temperatures in the eastern Pacific Ocean near the equator. The ENSO Blog estimated a 75% chance that La Niña conditions would persist through the end of the year, in part due to a strengthening Walker circulation.

== Monthly summary ==
January 2020 had an average global surface land and water temperature of 55.65 °F (13.14 °C), which was 2.05°F (1.14°C) above the 20th century average. This made January 2020 the warmest January on record, surpassing 2016 by 0.04°F (0.02°C). The month's departure from the average was the fourth highest of any month ever recorded. January 2020 was also the warmest January on record in the Northern Hemisphere.

February 2020 had an average global surface land and water temperature of 55.91 °F (13.28 °C), which was 2.11°F (1.17°C) above the 20th century average. It was the second warmest February on record, behind only 2016.

March 2020 had an average global surface land and water temperature of 56.99 °F (13.88 °C), which was 2.09°F (1.16°C) above the 20th century average. The month was the warmest March on record for South America.

April 2020 had an average global surface land and water temperature of 58.61 °F (14.78 °C), which was 1.91°F (1.06°C) above the 20th century average. The month was the warmest April on record for the Caribbean, with reliable records for the area beginning in 1910. The global ocean temperature during the month was 62.39 °F (16.88 °C), which was the highest April temperature since global records began in 1880.

May 2020 had an average global surface land and water temperature of 60.31 °F (15.73 °C), tying 2016 for the warmest May on record. The temperature was 1.71°F (0.95°C) above the 20th century average. It was the hottest ever recorded May in the Northern Hemisphere, and for all of Asia.

June 2020 had an average global surface land and water temperature of 61.56 °F (16.42 °C), which was 1.66°F (0.92°C) above the 20th century average.

July 2020 had an average global surface land and water temperature of 62.06 °F (16.70 °C), tying 2016 for the second warmest July on record, and just shy of June 2019's record warmth. The temperature was 1.66°F (0.92°C) above the 20th century average. The Arctic sea ice extent was 23.1% below the average from 1981 to 2020, which was the smallest sea ice extent on record.

September 2020 had an average global surface land and water temperature of 59.0 °F (15.0 °C) which was the highest global surface land and water temperature in 141 year record by 1.75°F (0.97°C) surpassing the record of 2015 and 2016 by 0.04°F (0.02°C).

== Summary by weather type ==
=== Winter storms and cold waves ===
==== North America ====
The winter season in North America, was harsh and the most significant weather events to affect North America in several years. It was the costliest on record with a damage total of at least $197 billion (2021 USD). This season included four storms with reaching Category 3 on Regional Snowfall Index scale, however these storms occurred in 2021. These damages were mostly contributed by a crippling cold wave occurred in mid-February. Along with that, several other major events occur such as an early-season severe ice storm in the South, a powerful nor'easter in mid-December, another major nor'easter on Groundhog Day, two widespread major blizzards in mid-February that affected the South and the Midwest, a major blizzard in March that affected the Rockies, and a late-season nor'easter that affected most of New England. It was also the deadliest winter season in over a decade, causing at least 235 fatalities. A La Niña weather pattern influenced most of the winter in North America during the season.

=== Floods ===
In 2020, eighteen flood events occurred, of which twelve occurred in Asia, two occurred in Europe, two occurred in Africa, one occurred in North America and one occurred in South America.

In January, a subtropical storm named Kurumĺ caused heavy rainfall in southeast region of Brazil. The highest rainfall occurred in the state Minas Gerais's capital Belo Horizonte. The flash flooding also caused mudslides in the region. In Europe, UK suffered a severe winter flooding. It initially started in November last year, but the flood continued in isolated regions during December and January. It got worsen after Storm Ciara and Storm Dennis affected in February and caused flash flooding, becoming the wettest month since records began in 1910. England and Wales had on average of 169.9 mm (6.69 in) rainfall in this month beating the record from 1833. Meanwhile Spain and France had recorded flash flooding thanks due to Storm Gloria.

In February, the southeast region of Kentucky experienced heavy rainfall and affected the counties of Bell, Clay, Harlan, Knox, Leslie, Letcher, Perry and Whitley counties. The governor of Kentucky declared state of emergency in these counties.

In March, a series of flood events affected the countries of Rwanda, Kenya, Somalia, Burundi, Ethiopia, Uganda, Democratic Republic of the Congo, Djibouti and Tanzania affecting at least 1.3 million people. It began with heavy downpour which led to massive landslides and flooding.

=== Droughts, heat waves, and wildfires ===
In January, a Heat dome trapped over Australia caused temperatures in Western Australia to hit highs of 123 °F (50.7 °C), the highest recorded in the Southern Hemisphere at that point.

Additionally, several countries recorded record high temperatures during their respective 2020 hot seasons. These include:

- Ghana - 111.2 °F recorded on April 6 in Navrongo
- Russia - 100.4 °F recorded on June 20 in Verkhyoyansk
- Lebanon - 113.7 °F recorded on July 27 in Houche Al Oumara
- Iraq - 125.5 °F recorded on July 28 in Bagdad
- United States of America - 129.9 °F recorded on August 16 in Death Valley
- Cuba - 102.7 °F recorded on August 11 in Veguitas
- Paraguay - 113.9 °F recorded on September 26 in Pozo Hondo

From May 16–19, a heatwave affected southeastern Europe, with temperatures reaching 104 °F (40 °C).

In June, large wildfires spread across the Alaskan tundra. The Bush Fire burned across Arizona for several days, becoming the fifth largest ever recorded in the state.

=== Tornadoes ===
There were 1,058 tornadoes in the United States, as well as dozens of other tornadoes around the world. Worldwide, tornadoes have killed 90 people, including 78 in the United States. Tornadoes have caused US$4.4 billion in damage. For the first time in history, there were no tornadoes in the National Weather Service Wichita, Kansas coverage zone.

The first significant tornado outbreak occurred on January 10 and 11. Tornadoes in the Southeastern United States killed 7 people, and caused $1.1 billion in damage. An EF2 tornado in Louisiana caused 3 deaths and $1.325 million in damage.

On March 2-3, a tornado outbreak caused 25 deaths, and $1.607 billion in damage, mainly across Tennessee. An EF3 tornado struck Nashville, causing 5 deaths, 220 injuries and $1.504 billion in damage. Then, an EF4 tornado destroyed Cookeville and Putnam County.

On April 12–13, an outbreak of 141 confirmed tornadoes affected the southeastern United States. The outbreak left $3 billion in damage and killed 32 people, making it the deadliest tornado outbreak since 2014.

Despite the two months being the peak of the season, May and June together only featured 217 confirmed tornadoes in the US. May alone averages 276.

As Hurricane Isaias moved quickly north along the East Coast of the United States, it spawned an outbreak of 39 tornadoes that left two fatalities, both of which related to an EF3 tornado near Windsor, North Carolina. It was the strongest tornado spawned by a tropical cyclone in the United States since 2005.

=== Tropical cyclones ===
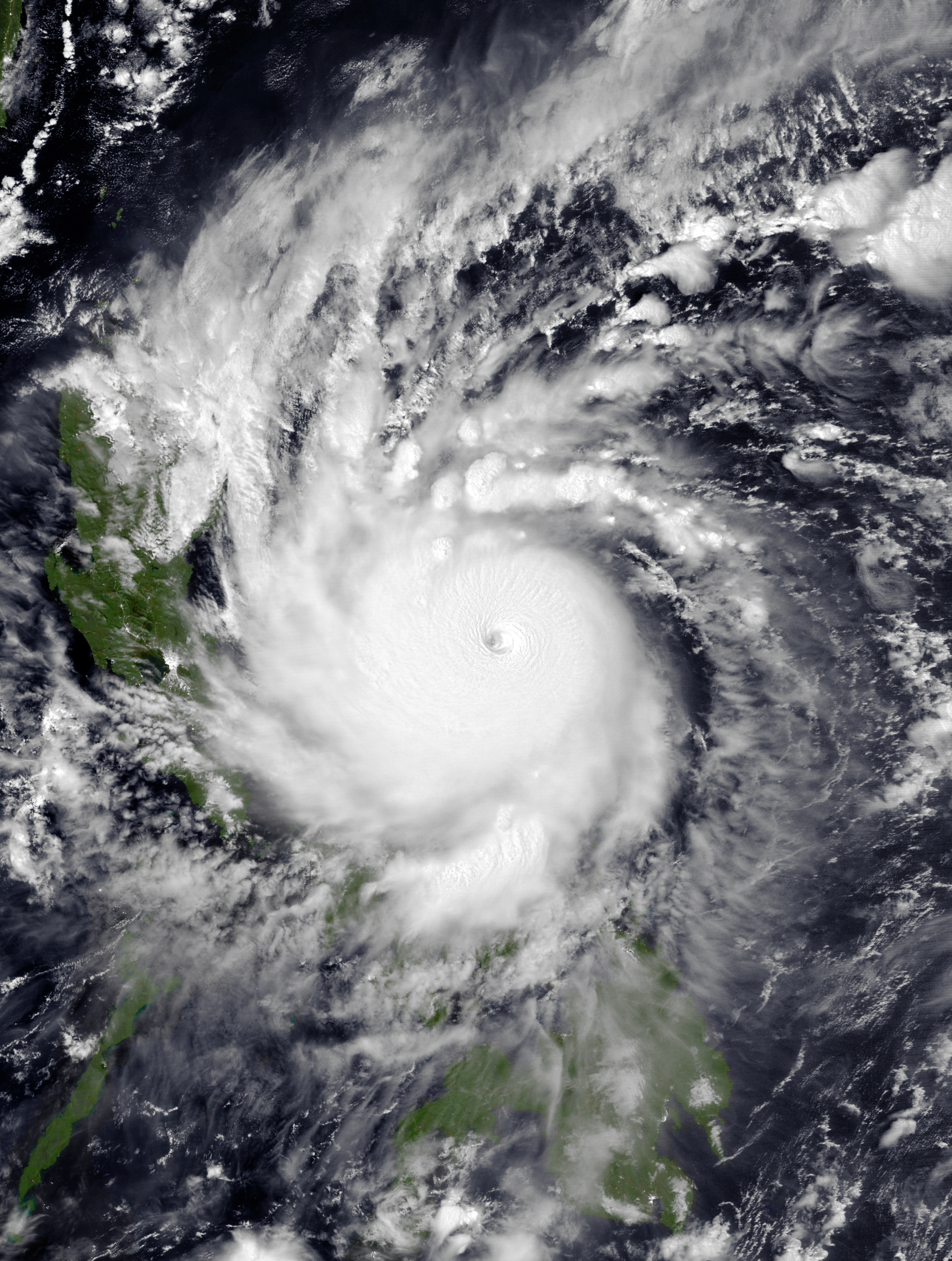
Satellite image of Typhoon Goni in October in the West Pacific Ocean, the strongest storm of the year

Throughout the year, 141 tropical cyclones formed throughout the world in bodies of water known as tropical cyclone basins. Of these, 104 were named, including a subtropical cyclone in the South Atlantic Ocean, by various weather agencies when they attained maximum sustained winds of 35 knots (65 km/h, 40 mph). The strongest storms of the year so far are Cyclone Harold in the South Pacific Ocean and Cyclone Amphan in the North Indian Ocean. The deadliest and costliest storm of the year was also Cyclone Amphan, causing over 100 fatalities in India, Sri Lanka, and Bangladesh. Tropical cyclones have caused US$20.6 billion in damage and killed 255 people.

The Atlantic hurricane season was the most active on record, with a record 30 named storms, surpassing 2005. There was a record 11 tropical cyclones that struck the United States, with the strongest – Hurricane Laura – leaving $19 billion in damage when it struck Louisiana. In November, powerful hurricanes Eta and Iota struck Central America within a two week period, resulting in significant damage and loss of life. The Pacific hurricane season had a record early start in late April, although it did not feature a hurricane until July 23, one of the latest dates on record.

The Pacific typhoon season was fairly inactive for the first half of the year, with its first storm, Vongfong, forming in late May and moving across the Philippines; the typhoon caused around ₱1.57 billion (US$50 million) in damage, and killed 5 people. For the first July on record, the month did not include a single typhoon. In October, Super Typhoon Goni made landfall in The Philippines with 319 k/mh (195 mph) winds, making it the strongest storm to ever make landfall on record.

The North Indian Ocean tropical cyclone was slightly above average with nine tropical cyclones, five cyclonic storms, four severe cyclonic storms, three very severe cyclonic storms, and one super cyclonic storm. The first storm, in the Bay of Bengal, formed on May 16 from a low-pressure area. It went on to strengthen into a super cyclonic storm, being designated Super Cyclonic Storm Amphan, and make landfall in India three days later, becoming the costliest storm ever recorded in the basin, until Cyclone Senyar surpassed it in 2025. Amphan simultaneously dissipated. In June, Severe Cyclonic Storm Nisarga became the first storm in the new thirteen-list naming system. After Nisarga dissipated, there was no activity between June 4 and October 11 – one of the longest gaps in inactivity on record. Then, on October 11, after the inactivity gap came to a close, Deep Depression BOB 02 formed. It made landfall in Andhra Pradesh and caused extensive damage. Two more depressions formed in October, and none were named – one of only a few occurrences on record. Gati formed on November 21, causing one of the longest naming gaps in history. Gati later became a Category 3 tropical cyclone on the Saffir-Simpson Hurricane Wind Scale, and made landfall in the Horn of Africa near Ras Hafun which became later the strongest cyclone to make a landfall Somalia since reliable records began in 1891. Two more storms formed in the Bay of Bengal – Nivar and Burevi, both impacting South India. Nivar was in late November and affected South India at Tamil Nadu. Burevi formed on November 30, and made a landfall in North Sri Lanka, but it stalled near Comorin and dissipated.

== Events in meteorology ==
- 24 March – The European Centre for Medium-Range Weather Forecasts (ECMWF) announced that a worldwide reduction in aircraft flights due to the COVID-19 pandemic could impact the accuracy of weather forecasts, citing commercial airlines' use of Aircraft Meteorological Data Relay (AMDAR) as an integral contribution to weather forecast accuracy. The ECMWF predicted that AMDAR coverage would decrease by 65% or more due to the drop in commercial flights.
- 24 June – The World Meteorological Organization announces new records for the longest lightning bolt (700 km) and the "megaflash" with the longest duration (16.73 s).

== Timeline ==
This is a timeline of weather events during 2020.

=== January ===
- January 3 - Jacksonville, Florida ties a monthly record high temperature of 85 °F (29 °C). However, the record was broken three years later on January 30, 2023, when Jacksonville hit 87 °F (31 °C).
- January 4-5 - Flash floods in Israel leave 4 people dead.
- January 10–11 – A tornado outbreak in the South Central and Southeastern United States results in 12 fatalities (7 tornadic and 5 non-tornadic) and 19 injuries from 80 tornadoes that caused $1.1 billion (2020 USD) in damage as well as 318,000 power outages. The Storm Prediction Center (SPC) issued a moderate risk of severe weather for much of the Southern United States, including a 15% hatched risk of tornadoes for this outbreak.
  - January 11 - An EF2 tornado in Louisiana during the Tornado outbreak of January 10-11, 2020 causes 3 deaths and $1.325 million in damage.
- January 11–20 – Cyclone Tino kills two people and caused $5.83 million (2020 USD) in damage across the Solomon Islands, Vanuatu, Fiji, Wallis and Futuna, Samoan Islands, Tuvalu, and Tonga.
- January 14–19 – A winter storm, unofficially named Winter Storm Jacob by The Weather Channel, kills four people and caused 21,000 power outages across the United States and Canada.
- January 17–25 – European Windstorm Gloria kills 14 people with three missing and caused at least $200 million (2020 USD) in damage as well as over 337,000 power outages across Spain, Portugal, France, Morocco, and Gibraltar.
- January 22–26 – Tropical Storm Diane kills 31 people and causes damage across Madagascar.
- January 23–25 – Subtropical Storm Kurumí becomes a factor of the 2020 Brazilian floods and mudslides which kills 70 people and caused widespread damage across Brazil.

=== February ===
- February 2–(Unknown) – A series of wildfires across the Paraná Delta burned 220,000 acres and caused $137,934 (2020 USD) in damage.
- February 5–7 – A tornado outbreak in the Mid-Atlantic and Southeastern United States results in one tornadic fatality and seven injuries from 37 tornadoes that caused over $925 million (2020 USD) in damage.
- February 6 – Meteorologists report a record high temperature of 18.3 °C (64.9 °F) on the northern tip of Antarctica.
- February 6 – A record-breaking 18.3 °C (64.9 °F) temperature is recorded at an Argentine weather base on the northern tip of Antarctica, according to the World Meteorological Organization (WMO). The previous record was 17.5 °C (63.5 °F) in March 2015.
- February 9 – Another Antarctic weather research station, located on Seymour Island, registered a temperature of 20.75 °C (69.35 °F), considered to be a "likely record" and requiring some open questions to be answered before being confirmed.

=== March ===
- March 2–3 – A tornado outbreak in Tennessee, Alabama, Southern Kentucky, and Southeastern Missouri results in 26 fatalities (25 tornadic and 1 non-tornadic) and 309 injuries from 15 tornadoes that caused $1.606 billion (2020 USD) in damage.
  - March 3 – An EF3 tornado during the Tornado outbreak of March 2–3 kills five people and caused $1.504 billion (2020 USD) in damage, becoming the 6th costliest tornado in United States history.
  - March 3 – An EF4 tornado during the Tornado outbreak of March 2–3 kills 19 people and caused $100 million (2020 USD) in damage.
- March 3–4 – A tornado outbreak in Vietnam kills five people (1 tornadic and 4 non-tornadic) and destroyed 350 homes and damaged 6,800 others.
- March 12–15 – Severe Storms in the Middle East kills 21 people and caused damage across Egypt, State of Palestine, Jordan, Israel, Iraq and Saudi Arabia.
- March 12–20 – Cyclone Herold kills five people and causes an unknown amount of damage across Madagascar, Tromelin Island, Mauritius, and Rodrigues.

=== April ===
New York City fails to touch 70 °F (21.1 °C) on every single day of the month for the first time since 1940.

- April 1–11 – Cyclone Harold kills 31 people with 22 missing and caused $123.5 million (2020 USD) in damage across the Solomon Islands, Vanuatu, Fiji, and Tonga.
- April 4–14 – The Chernobyl Exclusion Zone wildfires burn 116,139 acres.
- April 12–13 – The 2020 Easter tornado outbreak results in 38 fatalities (32 tornadic and 6 non-tornadic) and 257 injuries from 140 tornadoes across ten states that caused $3 billion (2020 USD) in damage and caused over 4.3 million power outages. The outbreak caused multiple tornado emergencies to be issued by the National Weather Service.
  - April 12 – An EF4 tornado, in Mississippi, during the 2020 Easter tornado outbreak, kills eight people and injured 95 others. The tornado was estimated to be 2.25 miles wide, causing it to be the widest tornado in Mississippi state history and the third largest in US history.
  - April 12 – An EF2 tornado in Georgia caused 8 deaths and injured 24 others. The tornado is notable for not having a tornado warning issued until it was already on the ground for 8 minutes.
- April 19–20 – A tornado outbreak in the Southern United States results in two fatalities from 22 tornadoes.
- April 22–23 – A tornado outbreak in Oklahoma, Texas, Arkansas, Louisiana, Mississippi, Alabama, Florida, and Georgia results in 7 fatalities (6 tornadic and 1 non-tornadic) and 64 injuries from 45 tornadoes that caused $1.1 billion (2020 USD) in damage.
  - April 22 - An EF3 tornado in Texas during the Tornado outbreak of April 22-23, 2020 causes 3 deaths, 33 injuries and $5 million in damage.
- April 29 –A 477 miles (768 km) lightning strike, also dubbed "megaflash", occurred over the southern United States on April 29, 2020 as a new world record for the longest lightning strike. This was verified on January 31, 2022.

=== May ===
- May 3 – A derecho sweeps through Missouri and Tennessee causing the worst power outage on record in Nashville. 1 person was killed and 3 others were injured.
- May 8–18 – Typhoon Vongfong kills five people and caused $50 million (2020 USD) in damage across Palau, the Philippines, and Taiwan.
- May 8 – A long track EF2 tornado hits Apodaca, Nuevo León, Mexico, which resulted in two fatalities.
- May 16-21 – Tropical Storm Arthur
- May 16–21 – Cyclone Amphan kills 128 and caused $13.7 billion (2020 USD) in damage across India (West Bengal, Odisha, Andaman Islands), Bangladesh, Sri Lanka, and Bhutan. Cyclone Amphan became the costliest cyclone ever recorded in the North Indian Ocean and the first super cyclonic storm to have formed in the Bay of Bengal since the 1999 Odisha cyclone.
- May 20 – A tornado in Indonesia killed two people.
- May 24–(Unknown) – Wildfires in Uttarakhand, India kills two people.
- May 27–28 – Tropical Storm Bertha
- May 30–31 – Tropical Storm Amanda

=== June ===
- June 1–12 – Tropical Storm Cristobal
- June 1–4 – Cyclone Nisarga kills six people and caused $803 million (2020 USD) in damage across India. Nisarga became the strongest storm to strike the state in the month of June since 1891.
- June 1–August 18 – Floods in Kerala, India killed 140 people, with 12 missing, injured 40 others, and caused $254 (2020 USD) in damage.
- June 3 – A derecho sweeps through Pennsylvania and New Jersey cutting power to 850,000 and killing 4.
- June 5–July 23 – The Bighorn Fire in Arizona injured seven people and burned 119,987 acres.
- June 10 – A strong tornado in Vietnam killed three people and injured 18 others.
- June 10-11 – A rare derecho sweeps through Colorado and moves northeast through the Rockies and Great Plains.
- June 18 - *The longest lasting lightning strike at 17 seconds takes place over Uruguay. This was verified on January 31, 2022.
- June 20 – Verkhoyansk, Russia, located about 10 km (6 mi) north of the Arctic Circle, recorded a temperature of +38.0 °C (100.4 °F), its highest ever temperature on record, and potentially the highest ever recorded temperature in the arctic.

=== July ===
July became the wettest July on record in Newark, New Jersey.

- July 9 - The hottest July temperature in Buffalo, New York history occurred, with a high of 98 °F (37 °C).
- July 9–11 – Tropical Storm Fay kills six people and caused over $350 million (2020 USD) in damage across the Southeastern United States, East Coast of the United States, and Atlantic Canada.
- July 20–30 – Hurricane Douglas caused damage to Hawaii and became the closest passing Pacific hurricane to the island of Oahu on record, surpassing the previous record held by Hurricane Dot in 1959.
- July 23–26 – Hurricane Hanna kills nine people and caused over $1.2 billion (2020 USD) in damage across Cuba, Hispaniola, the Gulf Coast (mainly Texas), and Mexico.
- July 30–August 5 – Hurricane Isaias kills 17 people and caused $4.73 billion (2020 USD) in damage across West Africa, Lesser Antilles, Greater Antilles, The Bahamas, the East Coast of the United States, and Eastern Canada.
- July 30–August 14 – Typhoon Hagupit, known in the Philippines as Severe Tropical Storm Dindo, kills 17 people will 11 missing and caused $411 million (2020 USD) in damage across the Ryukyu Islands, Taiwan, East China, Korean Peninsula, Kamchatka Peninsula, and Alaska.
- July 31–August 3 – Tropical Storm Sinlaku kills four people and caused $12.94 million (2020 USD) in damage across the Philippines, Vietnam, Thailand, and Laos.

=== August ===
- August 3–4 – A tornado outbreak from Hurricane Isaias kills two people and injured 26 people from 39 tornadoes.
- August 4 - An EF3 tornado from Hurricane Isaias in North Carolina kills 2 people, injured 14 more and causes $1 million in damage.
- August 9–11 – Tropical Storm Mekkhala caused $159 million (2020 USD) in damage across the Philippines, Taiwan, and East China.
- August 10–11 – A powerful derecho in the Midwestern United States results in four fatalities and caused widespread storm damage as well as 25 tornadoes. The overall derecho caused about $11 billion (2020 USD) in damage and thousands of power outages.
- August 15 – An EF1 anticyclonic fire tornado in California from the Loyalton Fire has a tornado warning issued by the National Weather Service, marking the first ever anticyclonic fire tornado to have a tornado warning issued for one.
- August 16 – Death Valley recorded a high temperature of 130 °F (54 °C), which, if verified, would be the 3rd hottest temperature ever recorded on Earth, and the hottest temperature recorded on Earth since 1931.
- August 16–24 – Hurricane Genevieve kills six people and caused $50 million (2020 USD) in damage across Southwestern Mexico, Socorro Island, Baja California Peninsula, and Southern California.
- August 16–20 – Tropical Storm Higos kills seven people and caused $142 million (2020 USD) in damage across Mainland China, Taiwan, Vietnam, and Hong Kong.
- August 18–December 31 – The Dolan Fire injured 15 people and burned 128,050 acres.
- August 20–29 – Hurricane Laura kills 81 people and caused $19.1 billion (2020 USD) in damage across Lesser Antilles, Greater Antilles, The Bahamas, and the United States. Hurricane Laura is tied with the 1856 Last Island hurricane and Hurricane Ida as the strongest hurricane on record to make landfall in the U.S. state of Louisiana, as measured by maximum sustained winds and Laura became the earliest 12th named storm on record.
- August 20–30 – Typhoon Bavi kills one person and caused $11.7 million (2020 USD) in damage across the Philippines, Ryukyu Islands, Taiwan, Korean Peninsula, North China, and Northeast China.
- August 21–25 – Hurricane Marco caused $35 million (2020 USD) in damage across the Leeward Islands, Venezuela, Central America, the Cayman Islands, Jamaica, Cuba, Yucatán Peninsula, and the Gulf Coast of the United States.
- August 27–September 7 – Typhoon Maysak kills 46 people and caused over $100 million (2020 USD) in damage across the Philippines, Japan, Korean Peninsula, Northeast China, and Russian Far East.
- August 30–September 10 – Typhoon Haishen kills four people with six missing and caused over $100 million (2020 USD) in damage across the Mariana Islands, Japan, South Korea, North Korea, and Northeastern China.

=== September ===
- September 1–4 – Hurricane Nana caused $20 million (2020 USD) in damage across the Windward Islands, Jamaica, the Cayman Islands, Honduras, Belize, Guatemala, and Mexico.
- September 7–8 – The 2020 Utah windstorm kills one person and caused 200,000 power outages across Utah.
- September 7–28 – Hurricane Paulette kills one person and caused $50 million (2020 USD) in damage across Cape Verde, Bermuda, the East Coast of the United States, Azores, and Madeira.
- September 11–18 – Hurricane Sally kills nine people and caused $7.3 billion (2020 USD) in damage across The Bahamas, Cuba, the U.S. Gulf Coast, and the Southeastern United States.
- September 12–24 – Hurricane Teddy kills three people and caused $35 million (2020 USD) in damage across the Lesser Antilles, Bermuda, the East Coast of the United States, Atlantic Canada, and Southern Greenland.
- September 14–17 – Tropical Storm Vicky kills one person and caused damage across Cape Verde.
- September 14–21 – Cyclone Ianos, also known as Medicane Ianos, kills four people with one missing and caused at least $100 million (2020 USD) in damage across Libya, Italy, Malta, Greece, Crete, and Cyrenaica.
- September 15–18 – Tropical Storm Noul kills 18 people and caused $175.2 million (2020 USD) in damage across Laos, Thailand, Myanmar, Philippines, Vietnam, and Cambodia.
- September 17–19 – Subtropical Storm Alpha kills one person and caused $24.2 million (2020 USD) in damage across Portugal and Spain. Subtropical Storm Alpha was also the first subtropical cyclone or tropical cyclone observed to ever make landfall in mainland Portugal.
- September 17–25 – Tropical Storm Beta kills one person and caused $225 million (2020 USD) in damage across Mexico, the Gulf Coast of the United States, and the Southeastern United States.

=== October ===
- October 2–6 – Hurricane Gamma kills six people and caused $100 million (2020 USD) in damage across Honduras, the Yucatán Peninsula, the Cayman Islands, Cuba, and Florida.
- October 4–12 – Hurricane Delta kills six people and caused $3.09 billion (2020 USD) in damage across Jamaica, Nicaragua, the Cayman Islands, the Yucatán Peninsula, the Gulf Coast of the United States, the Southeastern United States, and the Northeastern United States.
- October 6–12 – Tropical Storm Linfa kills 139 people with 27 missing and caused $217 million (2020 USD) in damage across the Philippines, Vietnam, Cambodia, Laos, Thailand, and Myanmar.
- October 7 – A serial derecho sweeps through the New England region and produces 3 microbursts in New York: an 80mph one in Root, a 90mph one in Pittstown, and a 100mph one in Johnsonville.
- October 11–14 – Floods in Hyderabad, India associated with Deep Depression BOB 02, kill 98 people and caused $681 million (2020 USD) in damage across Hyderabad and other parts of India.
- October 11–14 – Tropical Storm Nangka kills four people with five missing and caused $2.94 million (2020 USD) in damage across China, Laos, Thailand, Myanmar, the Philippines, and Vietnam.
- October 13–16 – Tropical Depression Olef kills ten people and caused $27.9 million (2020 USD) in damage across the Philippines and Vietnam.
- October 18–25 – Typhoon Saudel, also known as Typhoon Pepito, caused $15.2 million (2020 USD) in damage across the Philippines, South China, and Vietnam.
- October 19–26 – Hurricane Epsilon kills one person and caused damage across the Caribbean, the East Coast of the United States, Bermuda, Canada, the British Isles, Iceland, and Portugal.
- October 22–30 – Typhoon Molave kills 71 people with 46 missing and caused $660 million (2020 USD) in damage across the Philippines, Spratly Islands, Vietnam, Laos, Cambodia, Thailand, Malaysia, and Myanmar.
- October 24–29 – Hurricane Zeta kills nine people and caused $4.4 billion (2020 USD) in damage across the Cayman Islands, Jamaica, Central America, Yucatán Peninsula, the Gulf Coast of the United States, the Southeastern United States, the Mid-Atlantic United States, New England, Ireland, and the United Kingdom.
- October 26–November 6 – Typhoon Goni, also known as Super Typhoon Rolly, kills 32 people and caused $415 million (2020 USD) in damage across the Philippines, Vietnam, Cambodia, and Laos.
- October 31–November 14 – Hurricane Eta kills 175 people with over 100 missing and caused $8.3 billion (2020 USD) in damage across San Andrés, Jamaica, Central America, the Cayman Islands, Cuba, The Bahamas, and the Southeastern United States.

=== November ===
- November 8–15 – Typhoon Vamco, also known as Typhoon Ulysses, kills 102 people with 10 missing and caused $437.4 million (2020 USD) in damage across the Philippines, Vietnam, Laos, and Thailand.
- November 13–18 – Hurricane Iota kills 84 people with 41 missing and caused $1.4 billion (2020 USD) in damage across the ABC Islands, Colombia, Jamaica, Central America (particularly Honduras and Nicaragua).
- November 21–24 – Cyclone Gati kills nine people with 30 missing and caused millions in damage across Somalia and Yemen. Cyclone Gati was the strongest tropical cyclone on record to make landfall in Somalia and the first hurricane-force cyclone to make landfall in Somalia.
- November 23–27 – Cyclone Nivar kills 14 people and caused $600 million (2020 USD) in damage across Sri Lanka, Andhra Pradesh, Tamil Nadu, and Puducherry.
- November 30–December 5 – Cyclone Burevi kills 11 people with five missing and causes damage across Sri Lanka, Tamil Nadu, and Kerala.
- November 29–December 2 – A tornado outbreak and winter storm, unofficially named Winter Storm Dane by The Weather Channel, caused over 100,000 power outages and caused $100 million (2020 USD) in damage across the Southern United States, the Ohio Valley, the Northeastern United States, and Eastern Canada. The storm had five tornadoes confirmed by the National Weather Service.

=== December ===
- December 4-8 - The December 5–6, 2020 nor'easter causes $25 million and 280,000 power outages in the Northeastern United States.
- December 10 – A tornado in South Africa kills one person and injures another.
- December 11–24 – Cyclone Yasa kills four people with one missing and caused $246.7 million (2020 USD) in damage across Vanuatu, Fiji, and Tonga.
- December 18–25 – Tropical Storm Krovanh, also known as Tropical Depression Vicky, kills nine people with one missing and caused $4.48 million (2020 USD) in damage across the Philippines, Malaysia, and Thailand.
- December 19, 2020 – January 3, 2021 – Tropical Storm Chalane kills seven people and caused damage across Madagascar, Mozambique, Zimbabwe, Botswana, and Namibia.
- December 30, 2020 – January 3, 2021 – The New Year's North American winter storm kills one person and caused 119,000 power outages. The storm caused $35 million (2021 USD) in damage across the United States and Canada.

== See also ==
- 2020 in the environment and environmental sciences
- Weather of 2019

Global weather by year
| Preceded by 2019 | Weather of 2020 | Succeeded by 2021 |
