= Storm Ciara =

North American winter storm and European windstorm in February 2020

Storm Ciara Early February 2020 North American storm complex
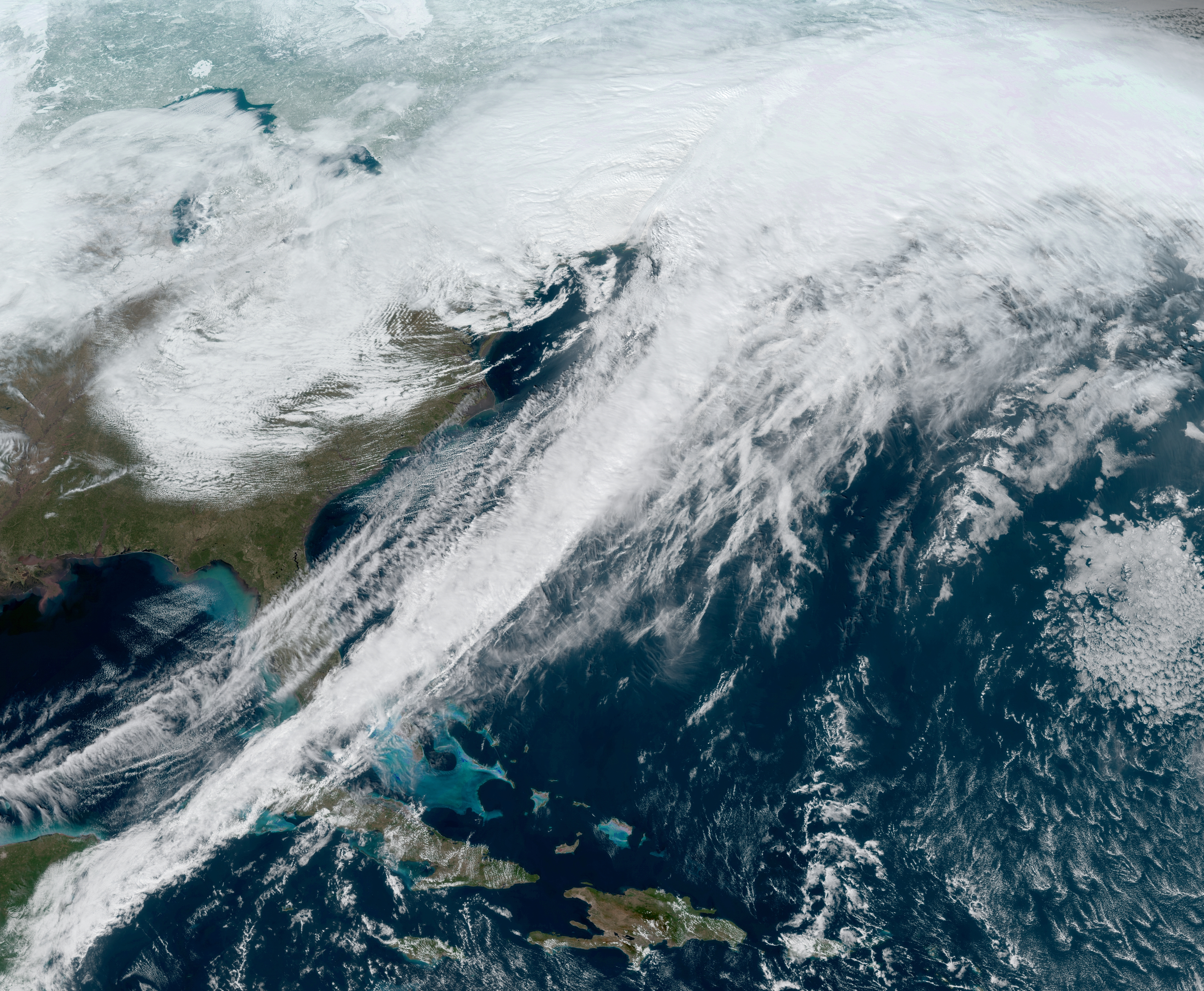
- Satellite imagery of Ciara off the East Coast of the United States on 7 February

Meteorological history
- Formed: 3 February 2020
- Dissipated: 16 February 2020

Extratropical cyclone European windstorm
- Highest gusts: 136 mph (219 km/h) at Cap Corse, Corsica, France
- Lowest pressure: 943 mb (943 hPa)
- Max. snowfall: 23.5 in (60 cm) at Warren, Vermont

Overall effects
- Fatalities: 17 fatalities (Note: Fatalities by country: United States – 4; United Kingdom – 3; Poland – 3; Sweden – 2; France – 1; Germany – 1; Slovenia – 1; Switzerland – 1; Italy – 1)
- Damage: At least £1.6 billion (€1.9 billion)
- Areas affected: Southern United States, Northeastern United States, United Kingdom, Ireland, Isle of Man, Northern Europe, Western Europe, Eastern Europe, Central Europe, Spain, Faroe Islands
- Power outages: >1,185,000
- Part of the 2019–20 European windstorm and 2019–20 North American winter seasons

Storm Ciara (Note: Ciara is pronounced Kee-ra according to official Met Éireann guidance issued at the time the naming list was announced.) (Note: The system received numerous other names in different countries, including Winter Storm Kade in the United States and Canada (unofficially named by The Weather Channel); Cyclone Sabine in German-speaking countries (named by the Free University of Berlin); and Storm Elsa in Scandinavia (not to be confused with a storm of the same name named by AEMET in December 2019).) was a powerful and long-lived extratropical cyclone that was the first of a pair of European windstorms to affect the United Kingdom and Ireland at peak intensity less than a week apart in early February 2020, followed by Storm Dennis a week later. Ciara caused widespread wind and flooding damage across Europe, and at least 13 fatalities.

The system emerged into the North Atlantic and underwent explosive cyclogenesis; the first severe weather warnings were issued for the United Kingdom and Ireland on 4 February well in advance of the storm's arrival. It was officially named Ciara by the Met Office the following day, becoming the twelfth named storm of the 2019–20 European windstorm season. Ciara subsequently made landfall in northern Scotland on 9 February and Norway the next day.

The precursor low named Winter Storm Kade by The Weather Channel brought heavy snowfall to the northern United States and eastern Canada, especially Newfoundland, New England and New York; further south in the Mid-Atlantic and Southeastern U.S., flooding and tornadoes were reported.

The worst effects from Ciara were felt in Ireland and the United Kingdom, where the storm arrived over the weekend of 8–9 February, bringing high winds and heavy rainfall that caused severe damage, widespread flooding, and three fatalities in the latter country. As Ciara moved across northern Europe with an unusually large wind field, eight further fatalities were recorded in a wide range of countries in mainland Europe, including as far away as Slovenia.

== Meteorological history ==
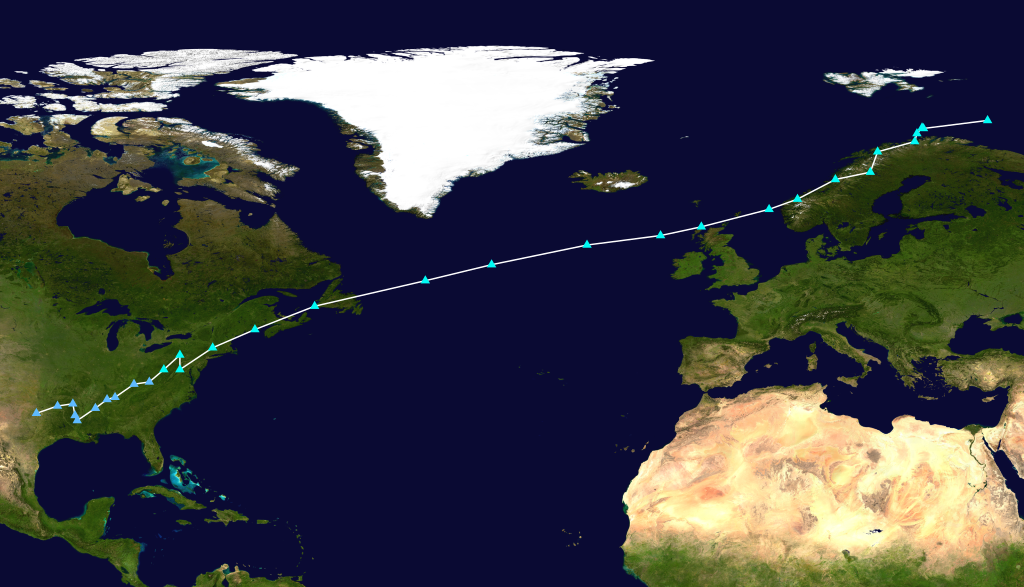
Map plotting the storm's track and intensity, according to the Saffir–Simpson scale Map key Saffir–Simpson scale Tropical depression (≤38 mph, ≤62 km/h) Tropical storm (39–73 mph, 63–118 km/h) Category 1 (74–95 mph, 119–153 km/h) Category 2 (96–110 mph, 154–177 km/h) Category 3 (111–129 mph, 178–208 km/h) Category 4 (130–156 mph, 209–251 km/h) Category 5 (≥157 mph, ≥252 km/h) Unknown Storm type Tropical cyclone Subtropical cyclone Extratropical cyclone, remnant low, tropical disturbance, or monsoon depression

On 4 February, the Met Office issued a yellow warning for wind for the following weekend for a potential storm, covering all of the United Kingdom. At the time, no name was issued for the system involved. The storm was formally named Ciara by the Met Office in the United Kingdom, Sabine by the Deutscher Wetterdienst in Germany, and Elsa by the Norwegian Meteorological Institute in Norway.

It formed out of a weak area of low pressure emerging into the Atlantic Ocean from the southeastern United States earlier that day; the precursor system had previously brought heavy snowfall to large tracts of the United States and Eastern Canada, while tornadoes were reported across the southern and mid-Atlantic states. The precursor system further developed over the northeastern United States, bringing 80 mph (130 km/h) wind gusts to coastal New England on 7 February.

== Preparations and impact ==
=== North America ===
On 4 and 5 February, snow fell in Texas, Oklahoma and Missouri; locally peaking at 14 inches (36 cm) in Jayton, Texas. 9,000 customers lost power in the Oklahoma City metropolitan area, where several school districts, colleges and universities closed due to the inclement weather. Scattered school closures also occurred in Texas and Missouri. A major collision closed the Westbound lane of I-70 near Rocheport, Missouri. In the Southeast, severe weather claimed the lives of 5 people and left 250,000 without power. A PDS-Tornado Warning was issued for Charlotte, North Carolina as a tornado touched down nearby. Those at Charlotte Douglas International Airport were advised to move away from windows. Severe thunderstorms produced wind gusts up to 76 miles per hour (122 km/h) in Florida, capable of toppling a crane near Tampa. Several inches of rain fell, causing severe flash flooding across the Carolinas and Virginia. A flash flood emergency was issued in Tazewell County due to the flooding. In total, 37 tornadoes touched down as a result of the outbreak. Over a foot of snow fell in northern New England. A severe ice storm also struck the Albany, New York metropolitan area, leaving 140,000 residents without power. 16 million across 6 provinces in Canada were impacted by this storm. By the time it had reached them, its precipation shield exceeded 2,500 kilometres (1,600 mi) across. Powerful wind gusts, exceeding 100 kilometres per hour (62 mph) at times, left tens of thousands without power across the region.

=== United Kingdom ===
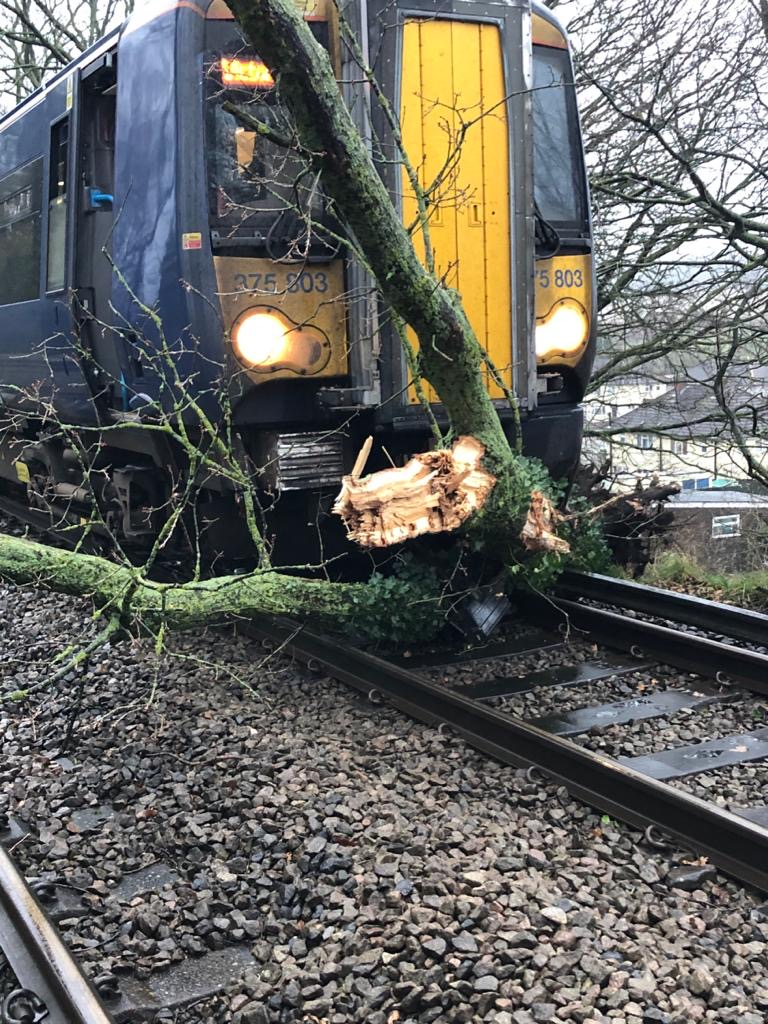
Train hit by tree.

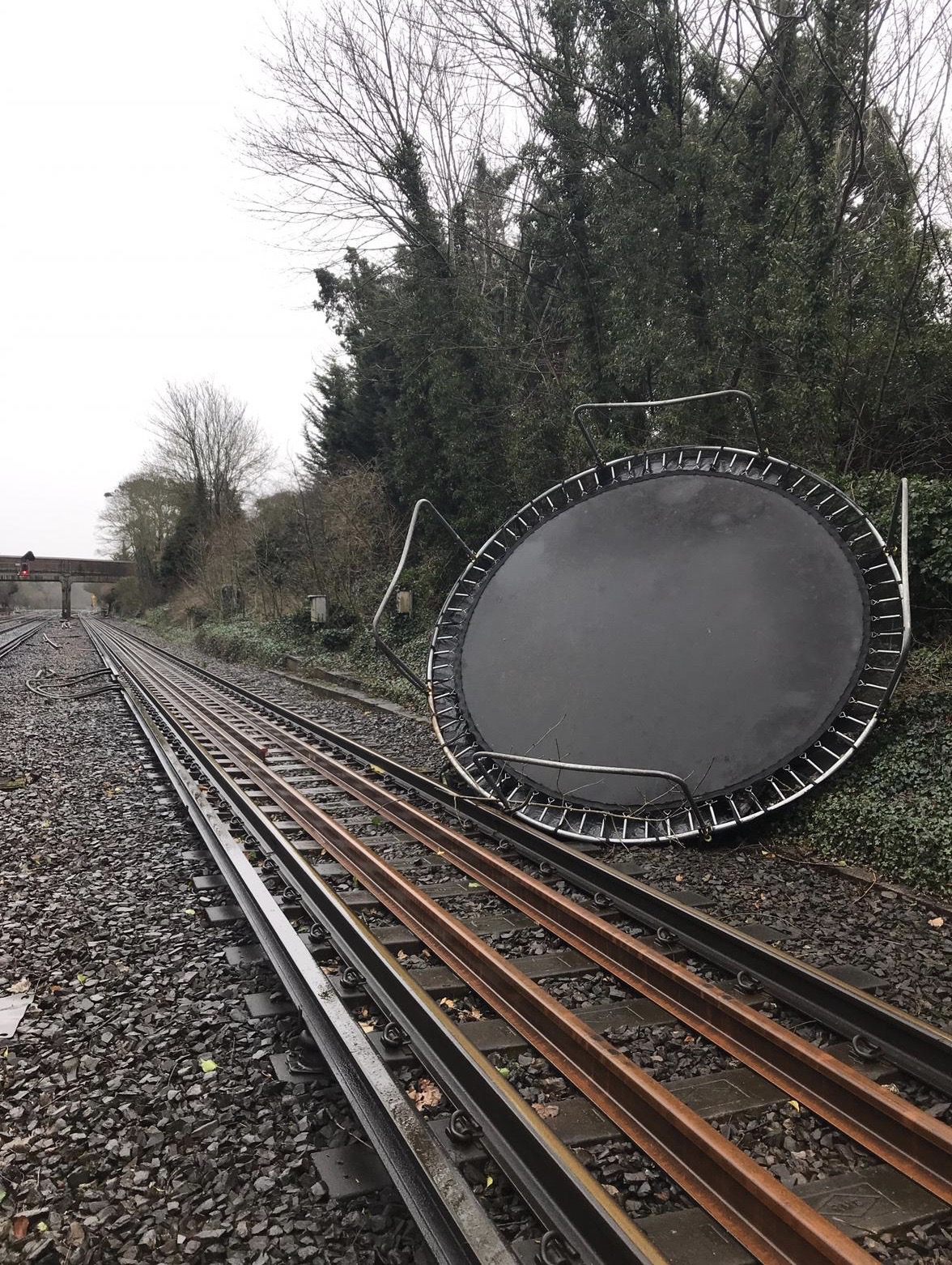
A trampoline on the tracks at Chelsfield.

Storm damage in the United Kingdom

On 4 February, the Met Office issued a yellow warning for wind for the following weekend for a potential storm, covering all of the United Kingdom. At the time, no name was issued for the system involved. The following day, the storm was formally named Ciara by the Met Office. For 9 February, an amber wind warning for much of England was issued, with the rest of the United Kingdom remaining under a yellow wind warning. The agency forecasted wind gusts of 50 to 60 mph (80 to 97 km/h) across the country, with the possibility of gusts up to 80 mph (130 km/h) along coastal regions.

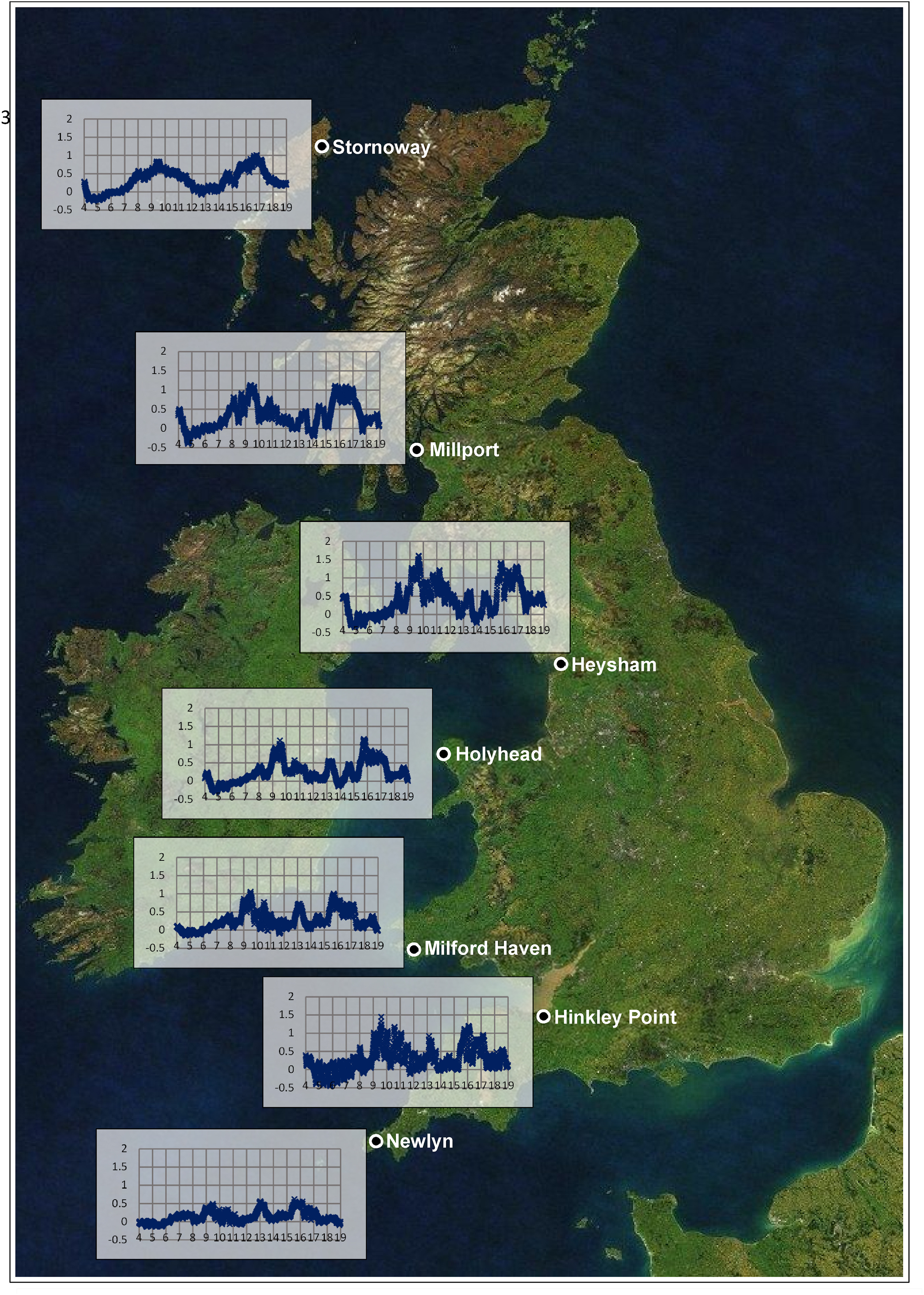
Storm surge height variability for Storms Dennis and Ciara at seven tidal gauges.

On 9 February, heavy rainfall from Ciara caused severe disruption across the British Isles. As a result, the Environment Agency issued 186 flood alerts, 251 flood warnings and 1 severe flood warning in England. The severe warning, which was later withdrawn, was issued for the River Nidd at Pateley Bridge where a water level of 5.1 m (17 ft) was expected to pose a "danger to life" and overtop flood defences. In the United Kingdom as a whole, around 539,000 people were also left without power due to the storm. The strongest gust recorded was 97 mph (156 km/h) at The Needles on the Isle of Wight. A wind gust of 109.5 mph (176.2 km/h) was recorded at Capel Curig. The highest rain total was at Honister Pass in Cumbria, where the Environment Agency recorded 179.8 mm (7.08 in) of rain over the weekend. A storm surge recorded at Heysham at 15:45 on 9 February 2020 measured 1.610 m, making it the 21st greatest monthly maximum surge recorded at Heysham in over 30 years.

High winds created by Storm Ciara over the United Kingdom and the North Atlantic meant that a British Airways Boeing 747-400 with the registration G-CIVP broke the record for the fastest subsonic flight between John F. Kennedy International Airport in New York City and London Heathrow. The aircraft was propelled by a strong tailwind and the jet stream across the Atlantic Ocean, completing the journey in 4 hours and 56 minutes. During the flight, the aircraft hit a maximum ground speed of 825 mph (1,328 km/h) and arrived 78 minutes ahead of schedule. Alongside two Virgin Atlantic flights which arrived around the same time, it surpassed the previous world record of 5 hours and 13 minutes, set by a Norwegian 787 Dreamliner in January 2018. In Hawick, Scottish Borders, part of a guest house and cafe collapsed into the River Teviot, leaving some rooms exposed.

On 10 February, a 58-year-old man from Micheldever, Hampshire, died after a tree fell on his car during the storm, where wind speeds were estimated to be in excess of 60 mph (97 km/h). The following day, a 77-year-old man from Clydebank, West Dumbartonshire, in Scotland, was killed after falling on ice and hitting his head. A man also died in Woolton, Liverpool, due to a tree branch falling in high winds.

On 11 February, a major incident was declared in Cumbria due to problems with water supply following the storm. A 100 m (330 ft) section of the water main was damaged according to United Utilities, who had detected higher than normal levels of chlorine in the water. Twenty water tankers were placed on stand-by on bridges across the M6. More than 20 schools in the Penrith area were consequently closed, and approximately 5,000 households had poor pressure or no water due to the damage.

==== Isle of Man ====
On 7 February, Ronaldsway Met Office issued an amber weather warning for the island for 8 and 9 February, ahead of the arrival of Storm Ciara. A yellow warning for coastal overtopping and a yellow wind warning were also issued. In preparation for the storm, the promenades in Castletown, Laxey and partially in Douglas were closed the following day. Isle of Man Steam Packet Company (IOMSPC) ferry sailings between the island and Heysham were cancelled between and including 8 and 11 February, resulting in no newspapers being delivered to the island. Severe gales on 9 February led to fallen trees in Smeale, Braddan and Colby, and a power outage in the Andreas area. For 11 to 12 February, a yellow warning for "icy patches and wintery showers" and a yellow warning for coastal overtopping were issued.

=== Ireland ===
On 6 February, Met Éireann issued a country-wide yellow wind and rain warning for 8 and 9 February, forecasting average wind speeds between 50 and 65 km/h (31 and 40 mph), gusts up to 110 km/h (68 mph) and rainfall of up to 40 mm (1.6 in). Orange wind warnings were additionally issued for the counties of Galway, Mayo and Donegal on 7 February. A country-wide yellow wind warning was also issued, in effect from 9 to 10 February, as well as a country-wide yellow warning for snow and ice for 10 to 11 February.

On 8 February, the opening ceremony for the 2020 European Capital of Culture in Galway was cancelled. The following day, almost 3,000 homes and businesses were affected by power outages. Severe flooding disrupted travel, including roads in Geevagh and Riverstown in County Sligo. The N80 through Portlaoise in County Laois was also made impassible due to flooding. Many soccer matches including the 2020 President of Ireland's Cup, Gaelic Athletic Association (GAA) games and racing were postponed or cancelled due to the arrival of Ciara.

=== Germany ===
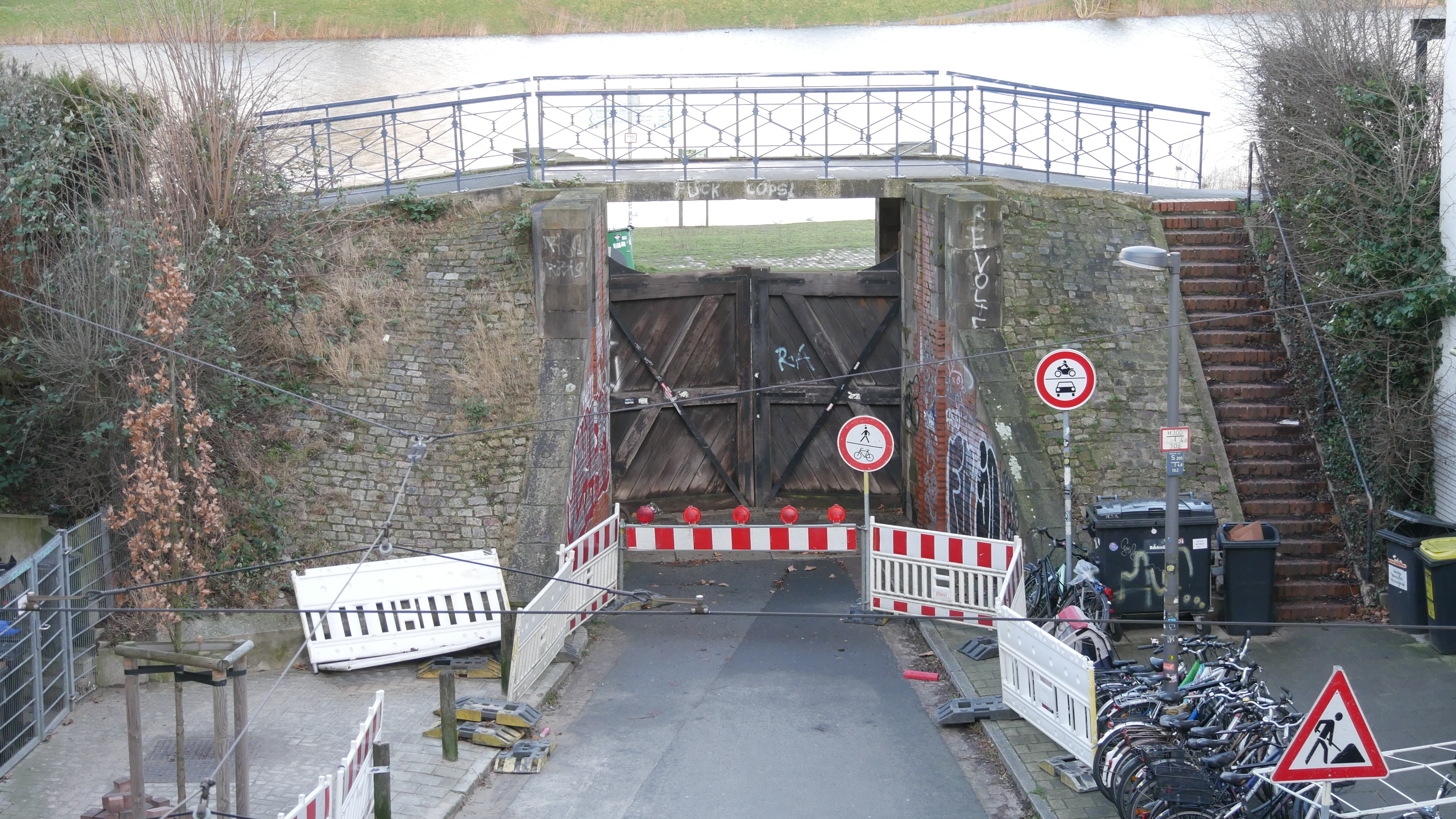
Closed coupure doors in Bremen, Germany in preparation for the storm on 10 February.

On 7 February, the Deutscher Wetterdienst formally named the storm Sabine in Germany.

On 9 February, wind speeds exceeded 140 km/h (87 mph) in the Harz mountain range, and 120 km/h (75 mph) in Kiel. On the same day, around 150 flights to and from Frankfurt Airport were cancelled, according to its operator Fraport. Flights to and from Munich, Cologne, Hannover, Berlin, Düsseldorf and Bremen were also affected. The Bundesliga football match between 1. FC Köln and Borussia Mönchengladbach scheduled to take place was postponed due to the storm.

In preparation for the storm's impacts on 10 February, a further 130 flights scheduled for this day were also cancelled. Lufthansa stated that it would cancel short-haul and long-haul flights until 12:00 GMT and 13:00 GMT, respectively.

One person in Lower Saxony died.

=== Austria ===
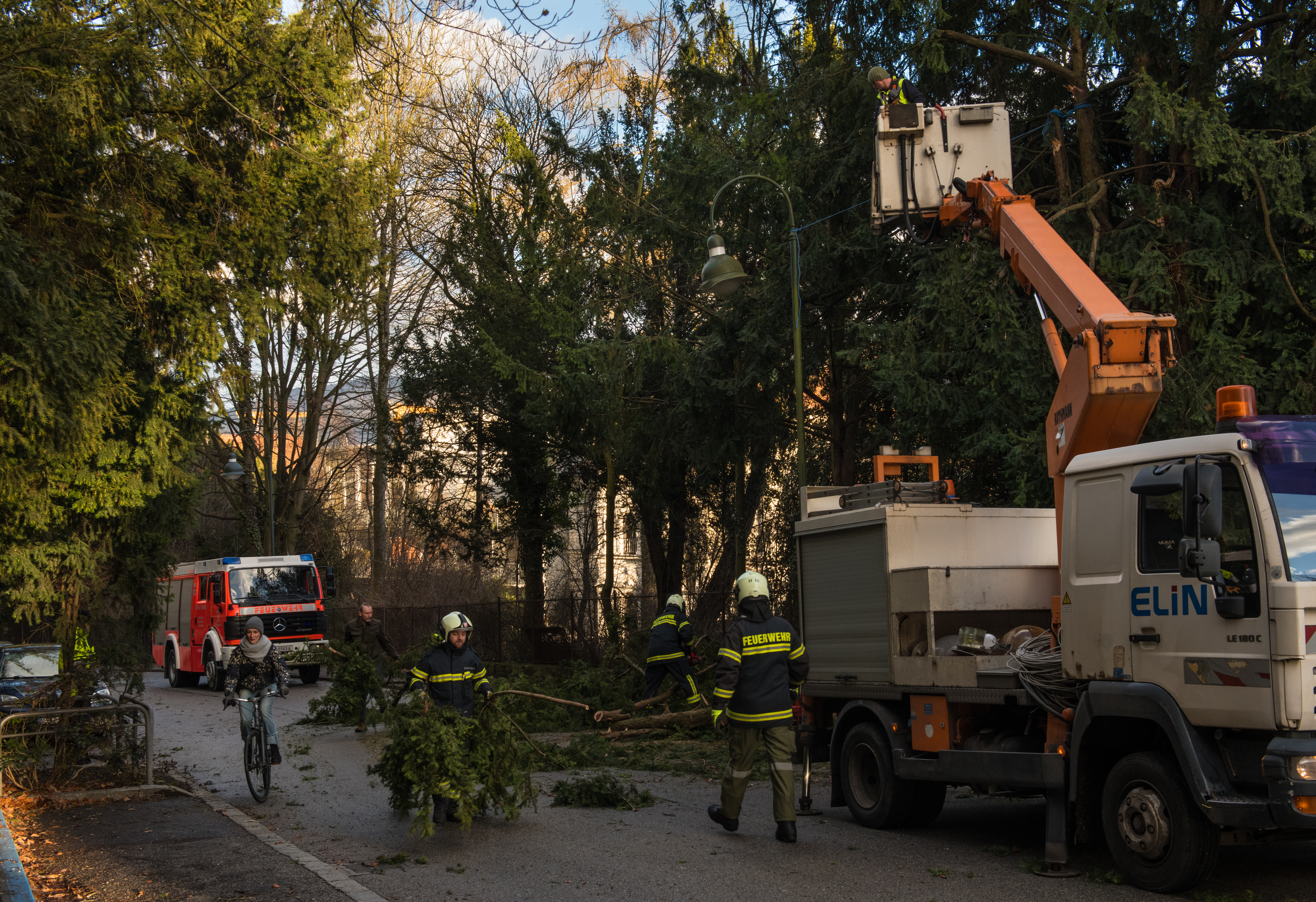
Windthrow in Linz, Austria on 10 February. Fallen trees accounted for a large proportion of damage from the storm in Austria.

On 9 February, the Central Institution for Meteorology and Geodynamics (ZAMG) issued the second-highest storm warning level for north Vorarlberg, North Tyrol, Flachgau, large parts of Upper Austria and Lower Austria and Vienna. Parks in Salzburg, Sankt Pölten and Vienna were closed as a precautionary measure.

The following day, the institute observed 149 km/h (93 mph) wind gusts on Hinterer Brunnenkogel in Tyrol, Austria. Infrastructure damage, windthrow and transport disruption accounted for the majority of the disturbance caused by the storm. Rail replacement services were put in place in Salzburg between Oberndorf and Lamprechtshausen, due to a tree falling onto tracks. Around 35,000 households were also left without power due to the storm.

=== France ===
In preparation for the Ciara storm, 35 French Departments were placed in orange alert.

=== Netherlands ===
On 7 February, the Royal Netherlands Meteorological Institute (KNMI) issued a country-wide yellow wind warning for the Netherlands, forecasting wind gusts of up to 120 km/h (75 mph). Later that day, the KNMI changed the earlier yellow warning to a country-wide orange warning, forecasting wind gusts of up to 130 km/h (81 mph).

=== Poland ===
On 10 February, three people died in Bukowina Tatrzańska after being hit by a wooden structure in high winds.

=== Italy ===
On 11 February, a woman died after being hit by flying roof debris in Traona in Lombardy.

=== Norway ===
On 10 February, the unusually low pressure from the storm led to multiple flight cancellations, as some aircraft were unable to compensate their altimeters.

=== Sweden ===
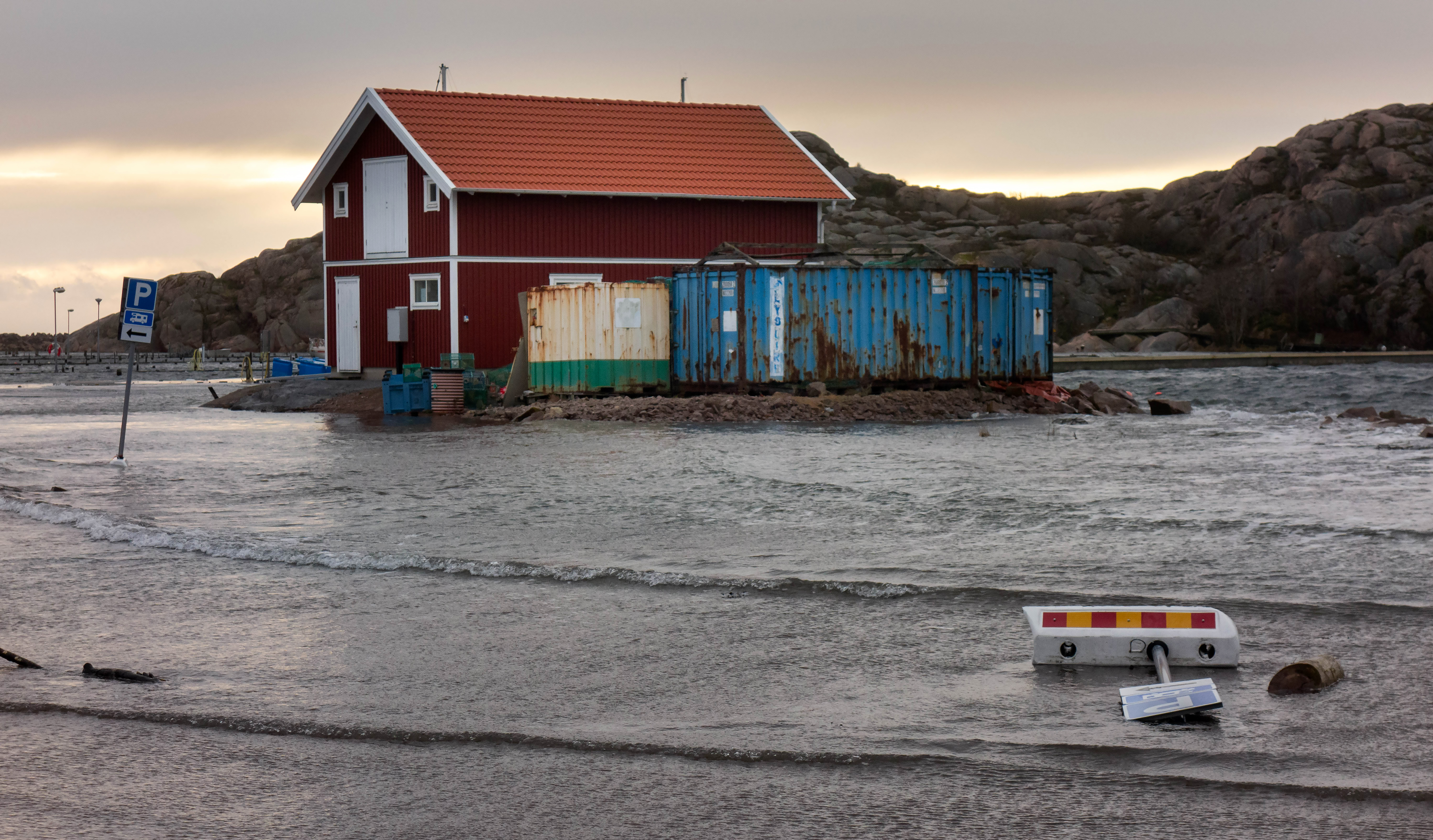
Flooded parking lot during Storm Ciara in Lysekil, Sweden, where sea level was approximately 100 cm (39 in) above average.

On 9 February, winds of around 25 m/s (90 km/h; 56 mph) were recorded on the west coast of Sweden. The previous day, several class-2-warnings had been issued by the Swedish Meteorological and Hydrological Institute. Rail services in the west and south of the country were cancelled due to a risk of track obstruction. Multiple ferries between the mainland and Gotland were cancelled, Uddevalla Bridge was closed and warnings were issued for Öland Bridge and Øresund Bridge. The wind also caused water levels to fluctuate significantly, with above average levels recorded in Bothnian Sea and Bothnian Bay and below normal in the south Baltic Sea.

On 10 February, sea level along the Swedish west coast were the highest in 34 years, in some areas as high as 137 cm (54 in) above average. Roads and parking lots were flooded and ferries were cancelled due to too high water level at their docking stations.

== Highest wind gust per country ==
Country	Max. Gust	Location
United Kingdom	176 km/h	Capel Curig
Ireland	154 km/h	Sligo
Germany	173 km/h	Brocken
Austria	149 km/h	Hinterer Brunnenkogel
France	219 km/h	Cap Corse
Netherlands	130 km/h	Vlieland
Poland	146 km/h	Władysławowo
Italy	164 km/h	Lignano Sabbiadoro
Norway	175 km/h	Henningsvær
Sweden	136 km/h	Smögen
Denmark	131 km/h	Kolding
Switzerland	155 km/h	Säntis
Belgium	130 km/h	Ostend

== See also ==
- January 2020 North American storm complex
- Storm Gloria (2020)
- Storm Dennis (2020)
