= November 26 – December 3, 2019 North American blizzard =

Winter storm

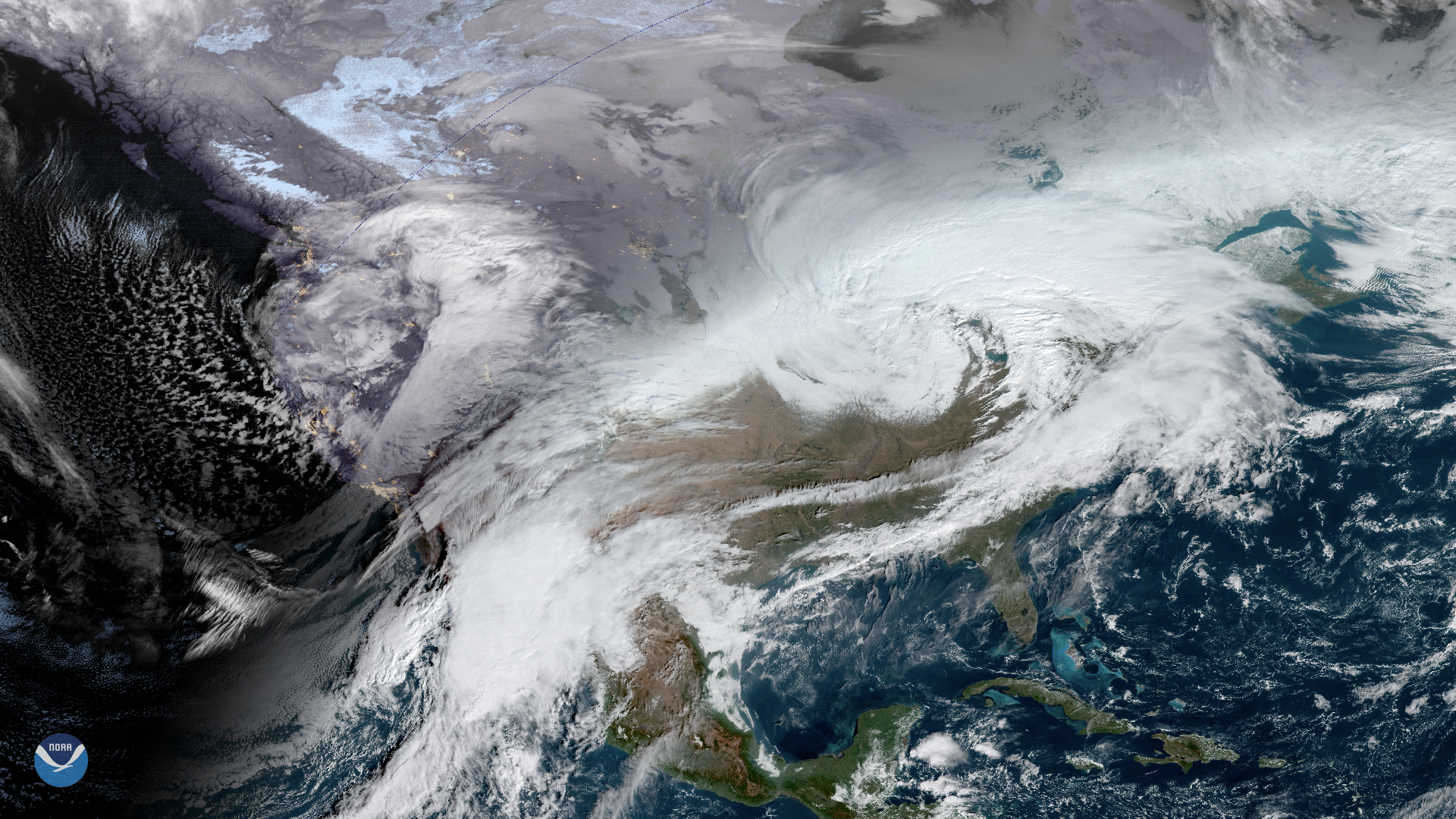
- The bomb cyclone over the Rockies as another system impacts the Eastern U.S.

Meteorological history
- Formed: November 26, 2019
- Dissipated: December 3, 2019 (Exited to sea)

Category 2 "Minor" winter storm
- Regional snowfall index: 3.61 (NOAA)

Tornado outbreak
- Tornadoes: 4
- Max. rating: EF1 tornado
- Duration: 58 minutes
- Highest gusts: 106 mph (171 km/h) at Cape Blanco, Oregon
- Lowest pressure: 973.4 hPa (mbar); 28.74 inHg

Overall effects
- Casualties: 8
- Damage: $200 million (2019 USD)
- Areas affected: Pacific Northwest, Southwestern United States, Midwestern United States, Northeastern United States
- Power outages: > 80,000
- Part of the 2019–20 North American winter and Tornadoes of 2019

The November 26 – December 3, 2019 North American blizzard was a major winter storm from the Rocky Mountains to the Northeast as well as a record-breaking windstorm along the West Coast (particularly California and Oregon). It occurred the week of American Thanksgiving, hampering travel for millions across the United States.

Moving ashore on the night of November 26 near the Oregon/California border, the storm produced a record low pressure reading of 973.4 millibars (28.74 inHg) in Crescent City, California. From November 27–30, the low merged with the subtropical jet as it tracked slowly eastward across the Rockies, Plains and Midwest. The combination of cold air, moisture and high winds produced a wide swath of blizzard conditions from Colorado through western South Dakota, including the Denver area. In Rapid City, 14.5 inches (37 cm) of snow fell on the 30th, breaking the one-day snowfall record for November. In Duluth, it was the city's heaviest snowstorm in ten years. As the first major winter storm of the season in the northeast, it dumped 22.6 inches (57 cm) of snow in Albany, where it was the heaviest snowfall since the 1993 Storm of the Century. Widespread totals in excess of 20 inches (51 cm) occurred in the Albany Metro, Southern New Hampshire and Northwestern Massachusetts with a regional peak of 36 inches (91 cm) of snow in New Ipswich, New Hampshire. The storm finally moved out to sea December 3. The storm was unofficially named Winter Storm Ezekiel by The Weather Channel.

== Meteorological history ==
Entering the United States late on November 26 as a powerful bomb cyclone and Pacific Northwest windstorm, the cyclone made landfall in Crescent City, California, with a minimum pressure of 973.4 millibars (28.74 inHg), unofficially breaking state records. It was unofficially given the name Winter Storm Ezekiel by The Weather Channel. Over the following three days it merged with the subtropical jet stream as it trekked slowly eastward over the Rockies, High Plains and Midwest. On December 1–2, the storm entered the Northeast as the first major winter storm of the season, before moving out to sea by December 3.

== Impacts ==
=== Southwest ===
While southern Oregon and Northern California received wind gusts exceeding 100 mph (160 km/h), Southern California and Arizona experienced widespread heavy rain, severe thunderstorms and flash flooding. Although much of the L.A. Basin only received between 0.5–0.75 inches (13–19 mm) of rain, local totals amounted to 2.17 inches (55 mm) of rain in Long Beach. Following the recent drought and wildfires, the ground had reduced ability to absorb rainwater and so the NWS warned of the possibility of flash floods and debris flows. Flash floods with up to two feet of standing water occurred in San Diego. Hail fell in Grotela in association with a heavier burst of rain (likely a thunderstorm) that moved through the area. Freezing levels fell below 3,000 feet (910 m), meaning that high elevation suburbs of Los Angeles like Palmdale and Victorville received accumulating snow. The snow was disruptive to Thanksgiving travelers, as it weighed down and snapped tree limbs and closed I-5 at Parker Road and the Grapevine. Over a foot of snow fell in the mountains of northern Arizona and several tornado warnings for issued for the central portion of the state, and 4 tornadoes touched down at night, causing $245,000 in damage in the suburbs of Phoenix. This became the latest in the year multiple tornadoes touched down in Maricopa County. A flooded Tonto Creek swept away a vehicle containing three children. Further east, Albuquerque set a record for their snowiest Thanksgiving ever.

=== Rocky Mountains and High Plains ===
Denver saw an unusually snowy November partially thanks to this storm alone. It dumped nearly twice the average monthly snowfall total (7.5 inches (19 cm)) on the city. Some parts of the foothills accumulated in excess of 40 inches (100 cm) of snow. In the central and northern Plains freezing drizzle fell on Thanksgiving Day and Black Friday, transitioning to snow, and then heavy snow, overnight. On the following day, November 30, winds increased, gusting from 45 to 60 mph at times, creating blizzard conditions. In Rapid City, 15.9 inches (40 cm) of snow fell, of which 14.5 inches (37 cm) fell in just one day, breaking the one-day and two-day November snowfall records respectively. In the northern Black Hills, a local mountain range, over two feet of snow fell. One person was killed in a rollover crash near Cavour. The individual, as well as their passenger, were not wearing seatbelts. A crash on I-15 near Willard, Utah, also killed one person.

=== Midwest ===
In Duluth, 21.7 inches (55 cm) of snow fell at the airport, where wind gusts frequently exceeded 35 miles per hour (56 km/h), meeting blizzard criteria. The snowfall accumulation was the ninth-heaviest on record and the most in ten years. Near Patton, Missouri, two boys, ages 5 and 8, and the vehicle they were riding in, were swept away. In this incident, a 33-year-old man and a 2 year old infant suffered injuries but survived. A 48-year-old man died in a separate incident near Sedgewickville, Missouri.

=== Northeast and Mid-Atlantic ===
In Albany, 22.6 inches (57 cm) of snow fell, making the storm the eighth and fourth-worst overall and for December, respectively, and the most intense since the 1993 Superstorm. Seven New York counties placed on a 'State of emergency' and Boston public schools closed in the storm's aftermath, although school boards closed in a dozen counties from North Carolina to Maine. In the New York Metropolitan Area, 80,000 lost power and 370 flights were cancelled, as 1.6 in (4.1 cm) of snow fell in Central Park and 2.5 in (6.4 cm) of snow was recorded at Newark Liberty International Airport. Pennsylvania transportation officials reduced the speed limit to 45 miles per hour (72 km/h) on I-80, I-81, I-84, I-476 and I-380. Several other states also put either travel restrictions or speed-limit reductions into effect, including New Jersey which put a speed restriction of 45 miles per hour (72 km/h) on the New Jersey Turnpike. Snowfall closed portions of the Blue Ridge Parkway and US 441 in North Carolina and Virginia. I-86 near Elmira temporarily closed. In addition to road issues, hundreds of flights were cancelled and thousands were delayed, including ten percent of all flights at Newark.

== Snowfall totals ==
From the storm's landfall in California to its exit from the Northeast, it produced snowfall in at least 30 states:

- Arizona: 30 inches at Arizona Snowbowl
- California: 49 inches near Cedar Grove
- Colorado: 15 inches at Wolf Creek Pass
- Connecticut: 18 inches at North Granby
- Idaho: 20 inches estimated at Sun Valley Resort
- Maine: 15.5 inches at Kittery
- Massachusetts: 28 inches in Peru
- Michigan: 28 inches at Gould City
- Minnesota: 25.1 inches near Carlton
- Montana: 14 inches in Choteau
- Nebraska: 14 inches in Chadron
- Nevada: 18 inches at Mt. Rose Summit
- New Hampshire: 36 inches near New Ipswich
- New Jersey: 14.3 inches in Highland Lakes
- New Mexico: 16.6 inches near Black Lake
- New York: 28 inches in Fultonville
- North Carolina: 6 inches near Santeetlah
- North Dakota: 16 inches in Fredonia
- Oregon: 15 inches estimated near Rock Creek
- Pennsylvania: 14 inches in Susquehanna
- Rhode Island: 11.8 inches in Chepachet
- South Dakota: 30 inches in Lead
- Tennessee: 4.5 inches in Mount LeConte
- Utah: 48 inches at Snowbasin Resort
- Vermont: 26 inches in Woodford
- Virginia: 4 inches near Jewell Ridge
- Washington: 23 inches near Wenatchee
- West Virginia: 7 inches near Parcoal
- Wisconsin: 31 inches near Washburn
- Wyoming: 30 inches in Muddy Gap

== Confirmed tornadoes ==
Confirmed tornadoes by Enhanced Fujita rating
EFU	EF0	EF1	EF2	EF3	EF4	EF5	Total
0	3	1	0	0	0	0	0

=== November 29 event ===
List of confirmed tornadoes – Friday, November 29, 2019 (Note: All dates are based on the local time zone where the tornado touched down; however, all times are in Coordinated Universal Time for consistency.)
EF#	Location	County / Parish	State	Start Coord.	Time (UTC)	Path length	Max width
EF0	Glendale to WNW of Scottsdale	Maricopa	AZ	33.56°N 112.12°W	10:49–10:59	10.09 mi (16.24 km)	100 yd (91 m)
EF0	Several trees were downed. One carport was destroyed while a second was blown onto cars.						
EF1	Eastern Glendale to Northern Scottsdale	Maricopa	AZ	33.56°N 112.06°W	10:54–11:06	8.85 mi (14.24 km)	200 yd (180 m)
EF1	Large trees were downed, some of which fell on carports and vehicles. Homes sustained roof damage, and a few had their roofs blown off.						
EF0	Higley	Maricopa	AZ	33.29°N 111.75°W	11:41–11:46	4.5 mi (7.2 km)	100 yd (91 m)
EF0	Small trees were damaged in two parking lots.						
EF0	Queen Creek	Maricopa	AZ	33.23°N 111.63°W	11:51–11:57	3.56 mi (5.73 km)	100 yd (91 m)
EF0	Power poles and trees were knocked down, and roofs were damaged in town.						

== See also ==
- January 2010 North American winter storms
- Tornado outbreak of December 16–17, 2019
