= Tahoe Donner =

Coordinates: 39°21′17″N 120°15′31″W

Tahoe Donner Homeowners Association
- Interactive map of Tahoe Donner Homeowners Association
- Location: Truckee, California
- Vertical: 600 ft (180 m)
- Top elevation: 7,350 ft (2,240 m)
- Base elevation: 6,750 ft (2,060 m)
- Skiable area: 120 acres (49 ha)
- Trails: 15: 40% Beginner, 60% Intermediate
- Longest run: 1 mi (1.6 km)
- Lift system: 5: 1 Quad, 1 Triple, 3 Surface
- Terrain parks: 3
- Snowfall: 400 inches (1,000 cm)
- Website: tahoedonner.com

Tahoe Donner is a large home owners association located in the Sierra Nevada, off of Highway I-80, in Truckee, California, which offers a ski resort, golf course, and other amenities. Tahoe Donner is one of America's largest homeowner's associations, with 6,473 properties, more than 23,000 members, and more than 7,000 acres in the Sierra Nevada mountains. Tahoe Donner was originally developed by Jack Kirby as a family resort. In 2017, USA Today voting panelists ranked Tahoe Donner "Number two for Best Cross Country Ski Resort in the U.S. and Canada."

In addition to the ski resort, Tahoe Donner amenities (some semi-private) include a private beach club and marina on Donner Lake, the Alder Creek Adventure Center (which includes a ski center, cafe, bar, bike shop, an equestrian center with horseback riding trails), a golf course, walking trails in the Euer Valley, the Trout Creek Recreation Center, and the Club House.

In the winter, Tahoe Donner offers alpine and cross-country skiing, snow play. The ski area usually opens 24–36 hours after receiving two to three feet of snow. The downhill ski area includes two chairlifts, three surface lifts, and more than a dozen trails. During the summer, the association offers activities such as golf, swimming, tennis, and hiking.

== History ==
Back in the 1960s Jack Kirby, an NFL player, purchased 4,020 acres from a Christmas tree farmer in Truckee, California, in the heart of the Sierra Nevada mountain range. In 1971 He opened the Tahoe Donner Resort to the public.
