= January 2020 North American storm complex =

Storm in 2020

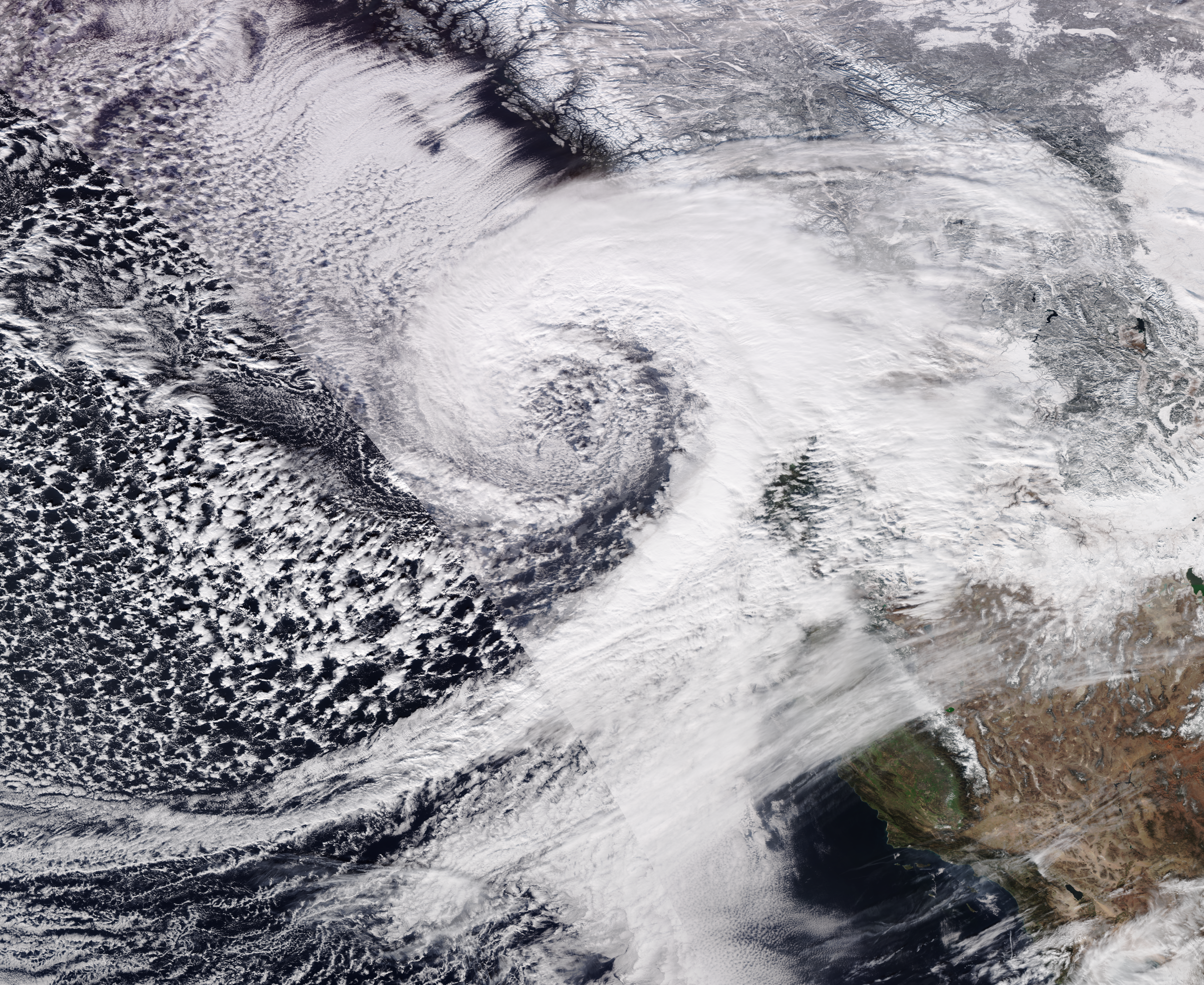
- The winter storm approaching the Pacific Northwest on 15 January

Meteorological history
- Formed: 14 January 2020
- Dissipated: 19 January 2020

Extratropical cyclone
- Highest gusts: 171 km/h (106 mph); Newfoundland
- Lowest pressure: 979 mb (28.9 inHg)

Overall effects
- Fatalities: 2 fatalities
- Areas affected: United States, Canada
- Power outages: 21,000+
- Part of the 2019–20 North American winter

In mid-January 2020, a complex system of winter storms that crossed North America, bringing heavy snowfall and high winds to Atlantic Canada and the northern United States between 15 and 18 January. At least one person was killed, in California, while at least one went missing, in Newfoundland. The person who went missing in Newfoundland was later found dead. Another two people died in Newfoundland after shoveling snow, although the connection to the storm is unclear. The winter storm caused historic blizzard conditions in many areas, particularly Atlantic Canada.

== Meteorological history ==
The system that would eventually become the series of mid-January winter storms was first noted as an area of disorganized cloudiness to the east of Japan on 10 January. Slowly crossing the north Pacific, the system organized sufficiently to be named Winter Storm Jacob by The Weather Channel on 14 January, while located off the coast of the Pacific Northwest. After undergoing rapid intensification into a strong Pacific Northwest windstorm, Jacob made landfall over Washington state on 15 January. After crossing the northern United States, the system emerged into the north Atlantic on 17 January, crossing the coast of Virginia. The system then once again underwent rapid intensification as it followed the coast north-eastwards, making landfall in Newfoundland as a deep bomb cyclone on 18 January; the following day, the system emerged into the Labrador Sea and merged with another area of low-pressure, contributing energy to the formation of Storm Gloria.

== Preparations and impact ==
=== United States ===
Winter Storm Jacob, as the system was unofficially known in North America, made landfall over the Pacific Northwest on 15 January. In the community of Joyce, on Washington state's Olympic Peninsula, 22 inches (56 cm) of snow was recorded. In eastern Oregon, high winds and blowing snow resulted in the closure of Interstate 84. Jacob brought heavy snowfall from Montana to Idaho and Utah and down into the Sierra Nevada of California on 16 January, including up to 26 inches (66 cm) of snow at Tahoe Donner, California. On 17 January, an avalanche at the Squaw Valley Ski Resort in northern California, site of the 1960 Winter Olympics, killed one person and seriously injured another.

Rare snowfall and freezing rain led to difficult commuting conditions on the morning of 17 January in Reno, Nevada; Omaha, Nebraska; and parts of the Texas Panhandle, including the Amarillo area. Freezing rainfall across Kansas, Missouri and Arkansas led to ice accretions of up to 0.5 inches (1.3 cm) widely by nightfall; icy conditions at Kansas City International Airport resulted in a Delta Air Lines Airbus A319 sliding off of a taxiway onto grass while attempting to take off, although there were no injuries.

As Jacob moved off into the Atlantic, winds gusting up to 60 miles per hour (97 km/h) were recorded across the Midwest and Mid-Atlantic states on 18 January, leading to difficult conditions with existing blowing snow, with 500 miles (800 km) of Interstate highways closing as a result. Up to 5 inches (13 cm) of snow was recorded in Chicago, Illinois; 7 inches (18 cm) in Detroit, Michigan; and 5 inches (13 cm) in Cleveland, Ohio. Further east, 3 inches (7.6 cm) of snow fell in Boston, and 2.1 inches (5.3 cm) fell in New York City. The snow in New York City resulted in a crash on the Bronx River Parkway with eight injuries occurring, one of which was life threatening.

=== Newfoundland ===
As Winter Storm Jacob emerged into the Atlantic on 18 January, it passed offshore close to Atlantic Canada, bringing high winds and heavy snowfall widely. Worst affected was Newfoundland, where St. John's recorded over 30 inches (76 cm) of snow, breaking the city's all-time single-day snowfall record. Mount Pearl had 93 centimetres (37 in) of snow. As a result of the severe blizzard, 21,000 homes were left without power and a state of emergency was declared across Newfoundland, banning all road travel except for emergencies. A 26-year-old man was reported missing after failing to return home from a walk in the blizzard in Conception Bay.

High winds, gusting up to 156 kilometres per hour (97 mph) in the Avalon Peninsula, 164 kilometres per hour (102 mph) in Bonavista, Newfoundland and 171 kilometres per hour (106 mph) in Green Island, Fortune Bay damaged the roofs of houses and created snowdrifts as high as 15 feet (4.6 m) against buildings and vehicles, trapping people indoors for several days and hindering emergency vehicle access; fire engines required snowplough escorts, and snowmobiles were used to transport patients to local hospitals in the days following the blizzard. The storm created an avalanche in The Battery, St. John's. Many meteorologists in the area described this storm as the worst winter storm they had ever seen.

== See also ==
- Storm Gloria (2020), which brought heavy snowfall across similar areas several days prior to this storm
