= Storm Alex =

Extratropical cyclone in October 2020

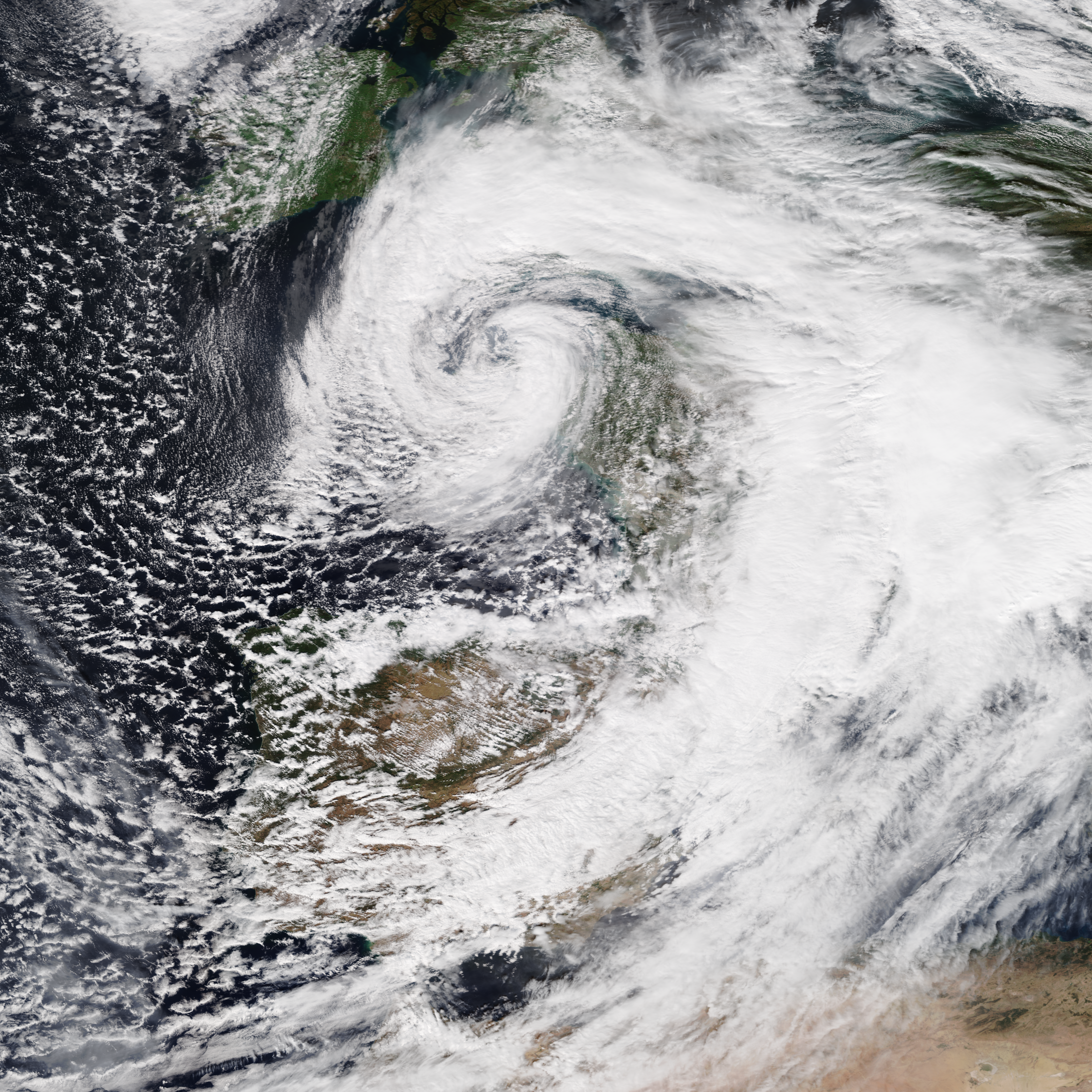
- Storm Alex making landfall in Brittany at peak intensity on 2 October

Meteorological history
- Formed: 30 September 2020
- Dissipated: 3 October 2020

Extratropical cyclone European windstorm
- Highest gusts: 187 km/h (116 mph) at Belle-Île, France
- Lowest pressure: 969 mb (969 hPa)

Overall effects
- Fatalities: 16
- Areas affected: United Kingdom, Spain, Portugal, France, Italy, Austria, Poland, Czech Republic
- Power outages: 115,000
- Part of the 2020–21 European windstorm season

Storm Alex was a powerful early-season extratropical cyclone that was particularly notable for its extreme flooding around the Mediterranean. Alex caused widespread wind and flooding damage across Europe, and at least 16 fatalities, with one more person missing. Alex was the first named storm in the 2020–21 European windstorm season.

Originally, a minor low-pressure system to the south west of Greenland late on 27 September. This pressure system tracked south eastwards, experiencing the Fujiwhara effect and then undergoing explosive cyclogenesis before making landfall in Brittany on 1 October. It was named by AEMET and Météo-France on 30 September, with Red warnings being issued for wind for parts of Northern France from 16:00 CET on 1 October.

The storm led to advection of Mediterranean air northwards where it interacted with the coastal topography producing an extremely heavy rainfall in southeast France, known as a "Mediterranean Episode". This brought record breaking flooding and devastation to many areas in the region.

The flooding in the south of France was purportedly the worst for at least 120 years, when records began.

== Preparations and impact ==
=== United Kingdom ===
Many warnings were issued for the storm by UK Met Office. The first being issued for 30 September for heavy rain across south west Scotland. This was a yellow warning, stating the possibility of localised flooding. Further warnings were issued in the following days. Daily rainfall records were broken for many places. The highest fall reported as of 21:00 BST, the Met Office reported the maximum rainfall total to be 78 millimetres (3.1 in) at Liss, Hampshire, with the maximum gust of 71 mph (114 km/h) being recorded at Berry Head, Devon.

==== Warnings ====
Warning severity	Event	Date	Areas affected
Amber	Rain	3 October	North Wales, South East Wales, South West England
Amber	Rain	3 October	North East Scotland
Yellow	Rain and Wind	2 October	South West England
Yellow	Rain and Wind	3 October	South Wales, Southern England
Yellow	Rain	3 October	South East England

=== France ===
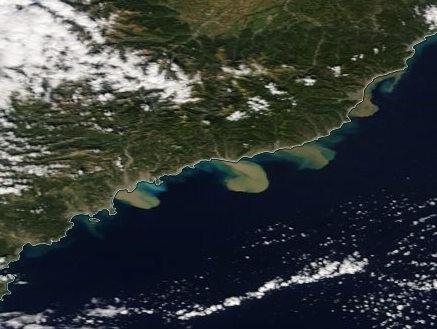
Sediment plumes in the Mediterranean Sea following devastating flooding in SE France linked to storm Alex

Departments in the south of France were particularly badly affected, with record breaking flooding and landslides. At least 5 people died.

== See also ==
- Storm Gloria (2020)
- Storm Ciara (2020)
- Storm Dennis (2020)
