= Storm Filomena =

January 2021 European windstorm and winter storm in Europe

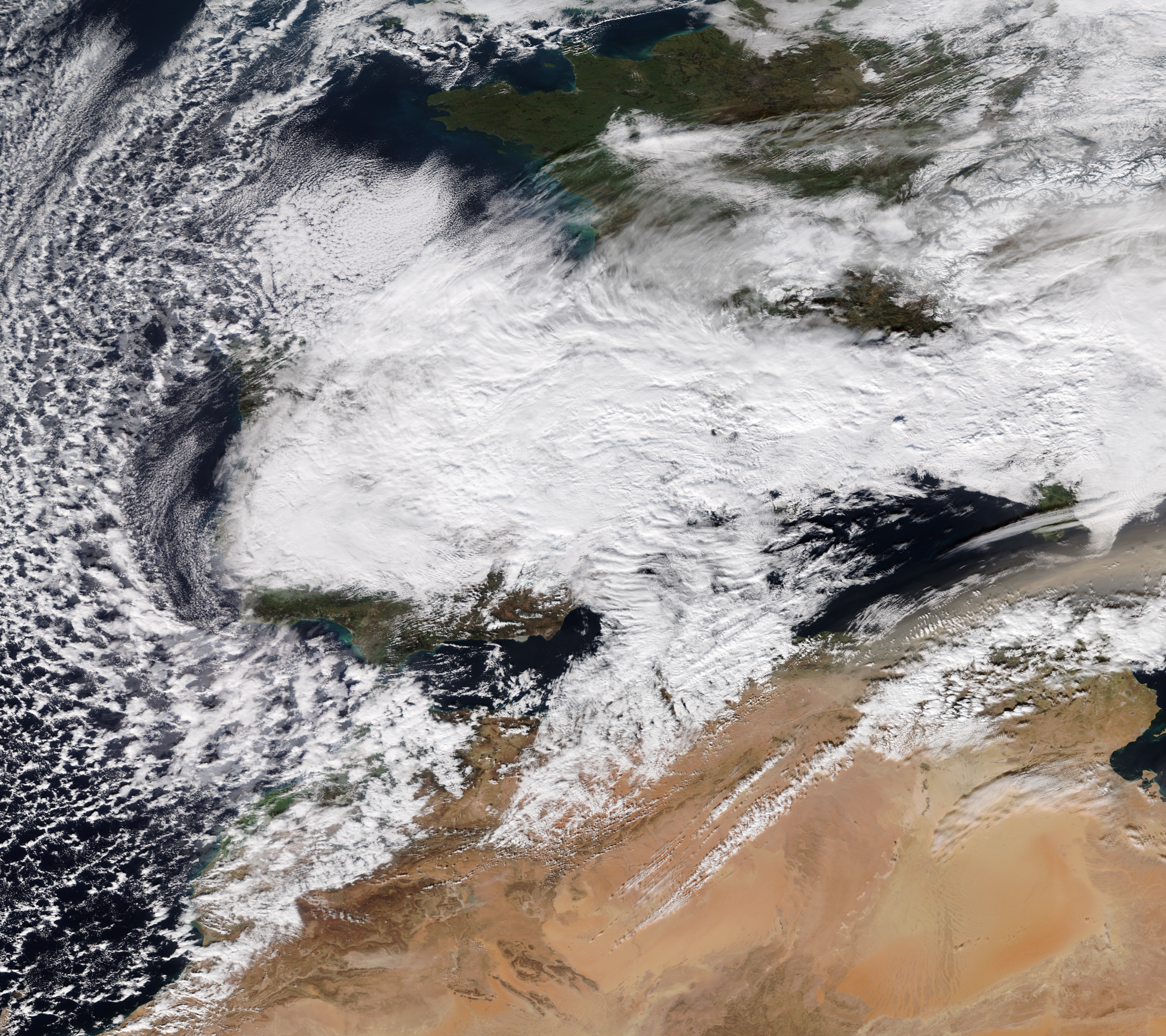
- Satellite imagery of Storm Filomena over the Iberian Peninsula on 9 January

Meteorological history
- Formed: 7 January 2021
- Dissipated: 15 January 2021

Extratropical cyclone European windstorm Winter storm Blizzard
- Lowest pressure: 995 mb (995 hPa)
- Maximum rainfall: 51 mm (2.0 in)
- Maximum snowfall or ice accretion: 60 cm (24 in)

Overall effects
- Fatalities: 5
- Damage: $2.2 billion (2021 USD) €1.8 billion (2021 Euro)
- Areas affected: Portugal, Spain, Andorra, France, Morocco, Italy, Vatican City, San Marino, Greece, Turkey, Ukraine
- Part of the 2020–21 European windstorm season

Storm Filomena was an extratropical cyclone in early January 2021 that was most notable for bringing unusually heavy snowfall to parts of Spain, with Madrid recording its heaviest snowfall in over a century , and with Portugal being hit less severely. The eighth named storm of the 2020–21 European windstorm season, Filomena formed over the Atlantic Ocean close to the Canary Islands on 7 January, subsequently taking a slow track north-eastwards towards the Iberian Peninsula and then eastwards across the Mediterranean Sea.

As Filomena was crossing the Iberian Peninsula, the leading edge of the storm collided with cold air that was being channeled down from the Arctic by an area of high pressure centred over the United Kingdom; the constant supply of cold air and slow movement of Filomena resulted in persistent heavy snowfall, reaching up to 60 cm (24 in) in Madrid. At least 5 people were killed due to the effects of cold weather in Spain during the passage of Filomena: three in Madrid and two in Málaga. Impacts elsewhere were minimal as Filomena moved away from the high to its north, lost its supply of cold air and weakened, and the storm was last noted over Ukraine on 15 January. The storm killed 5 people and caused an estimated $2.2 billion (2021 USD; €1.8 billion) in damages.

== Meteorological history ==
Storm Filomena formed as a low pressure centre along a frontal boundary over the Canary Islands on 7 January. By then, the coldest temperature ever recorded in Iberia was registered at Torremocha de Jiloca, in the Teruel, at −26.5 °C (−15.7 °F). The system then moved slowly north-eastwards, crossing the Iberian Peninsula between 8–10 January; the storm's slow movement contributed to the duration and severity of snowfall across Spain. During the time of Filomena's passage over the Iberian Peninsula, a powerful high-pressure system, named Anticyclone Antje by the Free University of Berlin (FUB), was centred over the United Kingdom, bringing cold air from the Arctic across the British Isles and down into the vicinity of Storm Filomena. This cold air became entrained into the leading edge of Filomena as it pushed north-eastwards against the southern edge of the area of high pressure, leading to heavy snowfall.

After emerging into the Mediterranean Sea, Filomena accelerated eastwards away from the area of high pressure, losing its supply of cold air in the process. Filomena crossed Italy on 11 January with minimal impacts, before stalling again between Italy and Greece on 11–12 January. Considerably weakened by this time, Filomena then moved over Turkey and stalled for a third time on 13–14 January, before accelerating northwards across the eastern Black Sea on 15 January. Filomena was last noted as a weak low over eastern Ukraine later that day, before being absorbed by a deeper low named Cyclone Dimitrios by the FUB by 16 January.

== Impact ==
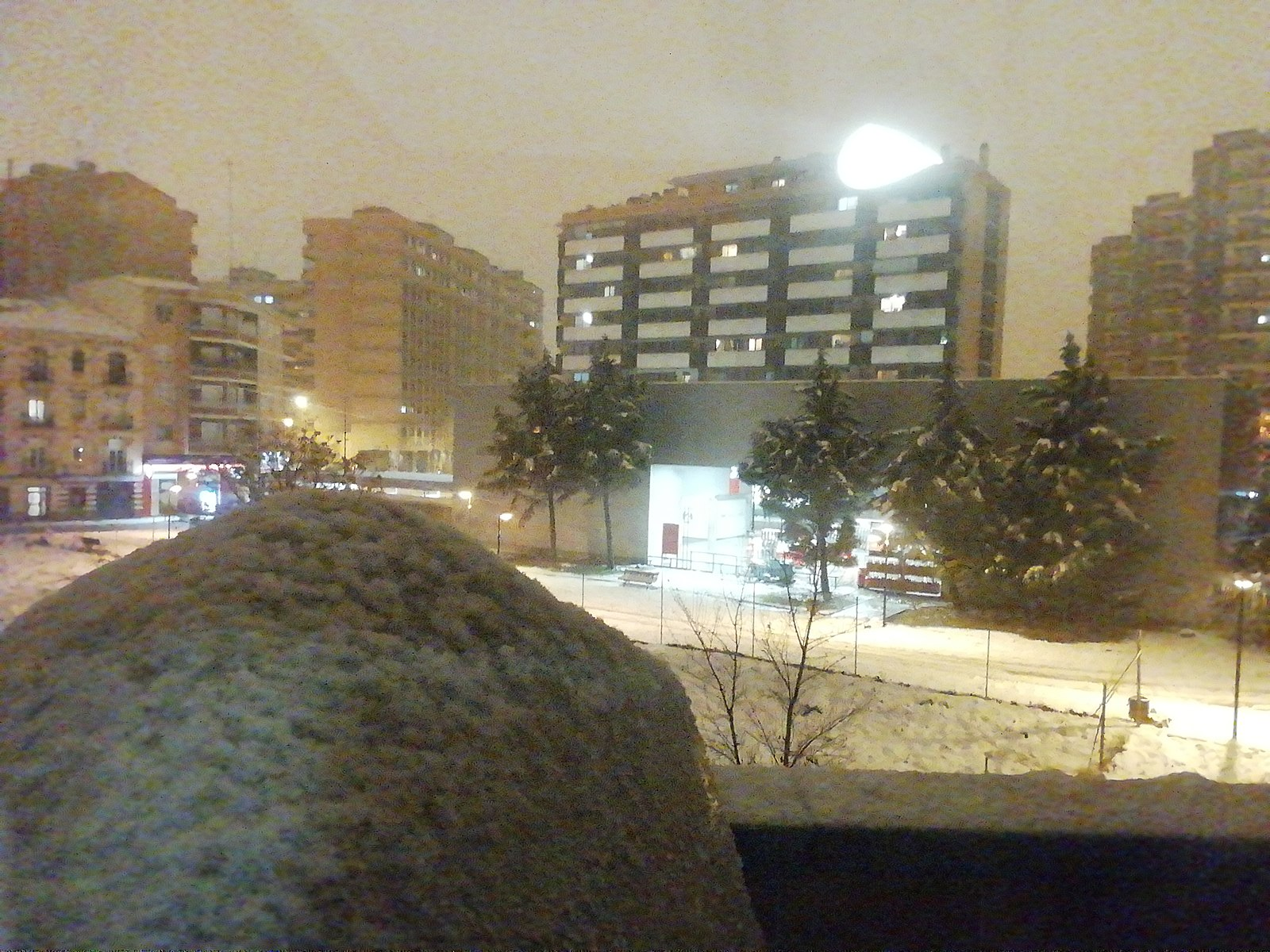
Heavy snowfall in Zaragoza on 9 January

The State Meteorological Agency of Spain (AEMET) named Storm Filomena on 5 January as they issued the first weather warnings ahead of the anticipated severe impact of the system. Near the coasts, wind gusts of up to 80 km/h (50 mph) occurred as Filomena made landfall on 7 January, as well as 25–50 mm (1–2 in) of rain in southern areas of Spain and Portugal which caused some flash flooding. Further inland and in higher elevations, snowfall of up to 60 cm (2 ft) was recorded. In the Sierra Nevada mountains of southern Spain, wind gusts of up to 121 km/h (75 mph) accompanied the large snow totals, leading to blizzard conditions. Due to the unprecedented amount of snowfall, some unsuspecting motorists were trapped on the roads for hours.

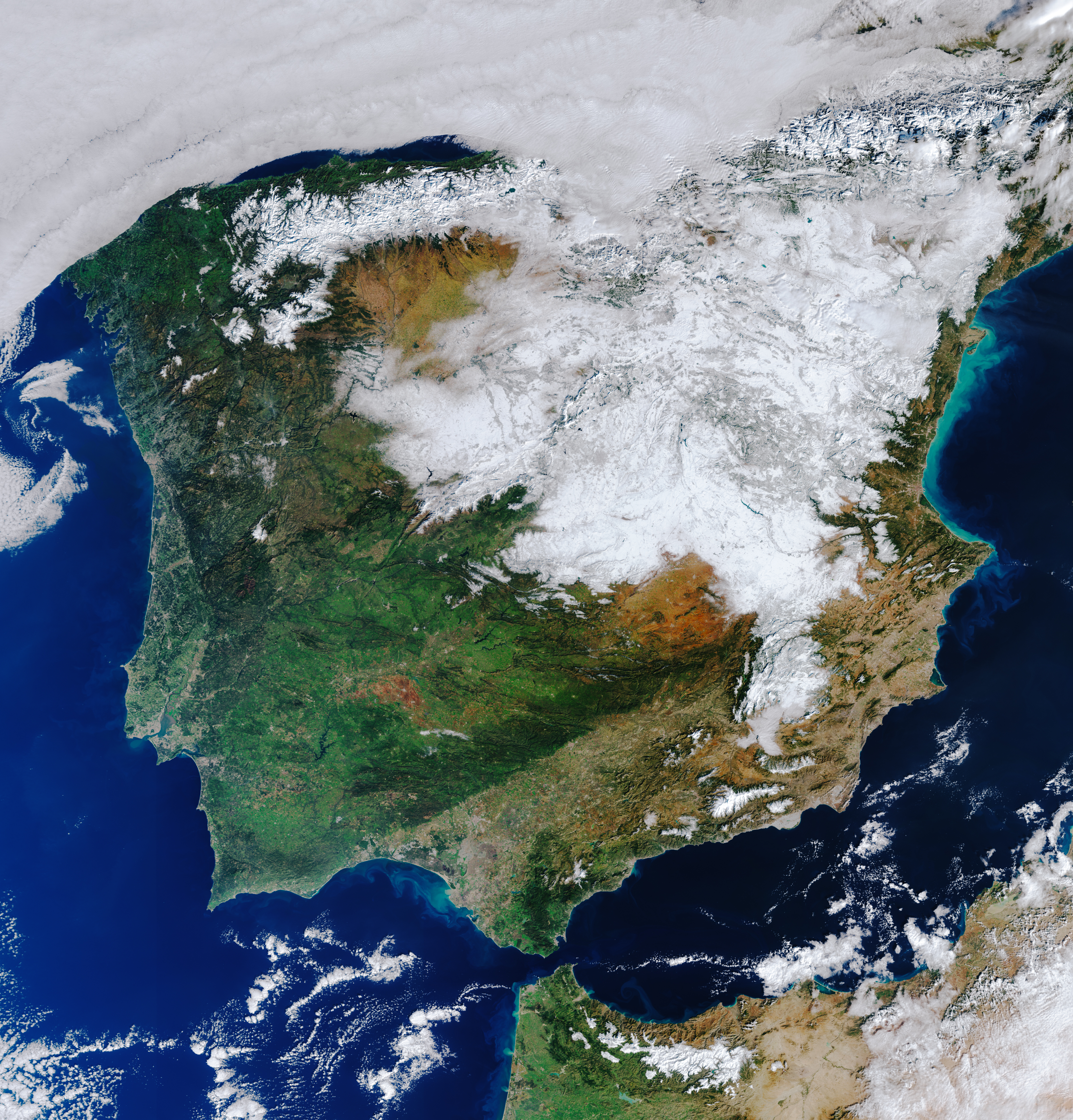
Snowfall from Filomena over the Iberian Peninsula

As Filomena began to move into the area, snow began to fall in Madrid on 7 January. This was followed by 30 hours of continuous snowfall on 8–9 January. On 9 January, AEMET reported between 50–60 cm (20–24 in) of accumulated snow from its weather stations within Madrid. The severity of the event was unmatched by any previous snowfall in the Spanish capital since at least 1971.

The EMT's bus lines, the commuter rail Cercanías as well as Madrid-Barajas airport all stopped operating due to heavy snowfall. The Metro de Madrid became the only available public transportation system, staying open 24 hours for only the second time in its history after the 2017 Madrid WorldPride event. Early estimates showed that around 150,000 trees in the city (18.5% out of the 800,000 registered trees) were damaged or had collapsed due to the snow. Later assessments by the Madrid Town Hall gave figures of 70% of trees in historical parks, 15% of trees in singular parks and an additional 450,000 trees in forest parks being damaged by the storm. Conifers and Mediterranean evergreen trees were particularly affected. During these events in Madrid, winter sports were practiced in the city. The slopes of the Cerro del Tío Pío in Vallecas were used as snowboarding runs.

The roof of "La Nevera", in the IES Ramiro de Maeztu school, the traditional home of the CB Estudiantes youth system, collapsed due to the weight of snow. The Military Emergencies Unit (UME) contributed to clear up accesses to hospitals—the event took place amid the third wave of the deadly COVID-19 pandemic and the connected vaccination effort—and the Madrid–Barajas Airport lanes.

Five people were killed in Spain during the passage of Filomena. By 9 January, two homeless people had died from the effects of cold weather, one in Madrid and one in Calatayud. Two more deaths occurred due to flooding in Málaga. On 16 January, a fifth dead body was found under lying snow in the Arganzuela district of Madrid.

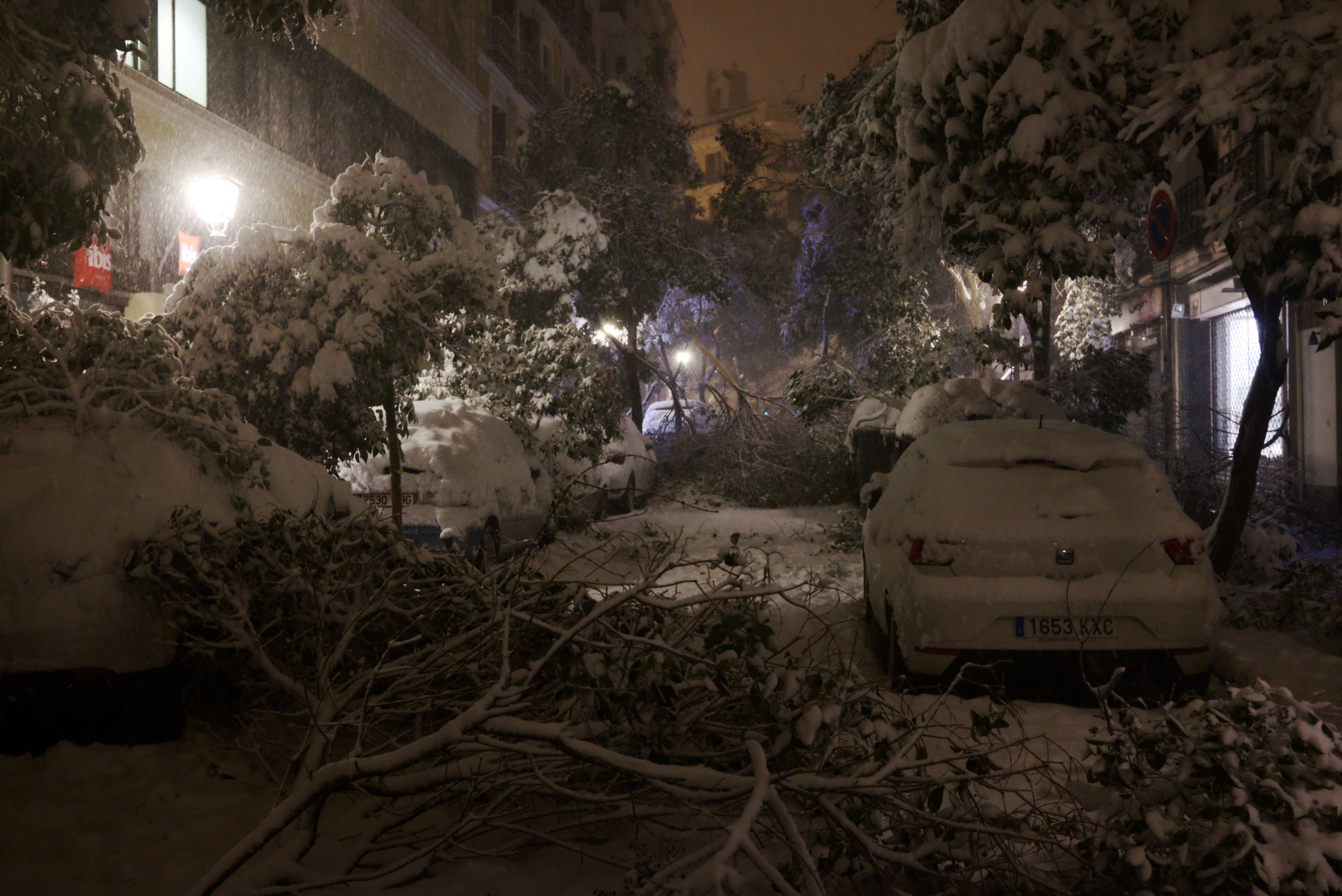
Shattered trees in Calle de Manuela Malasaña

Snowboarders in Vallecas

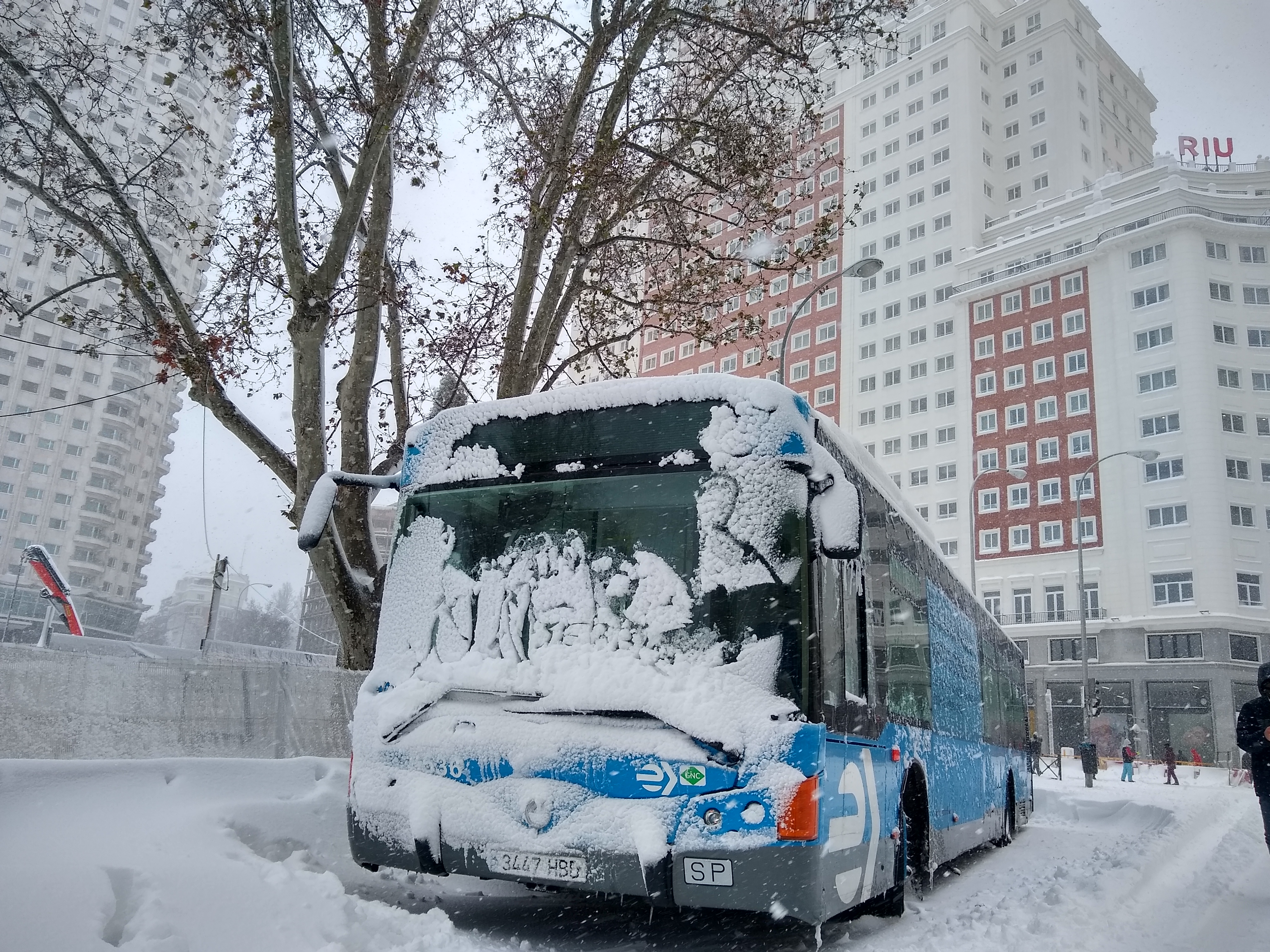
EMT bus stranded in Plaza de España

== Aftermath ==
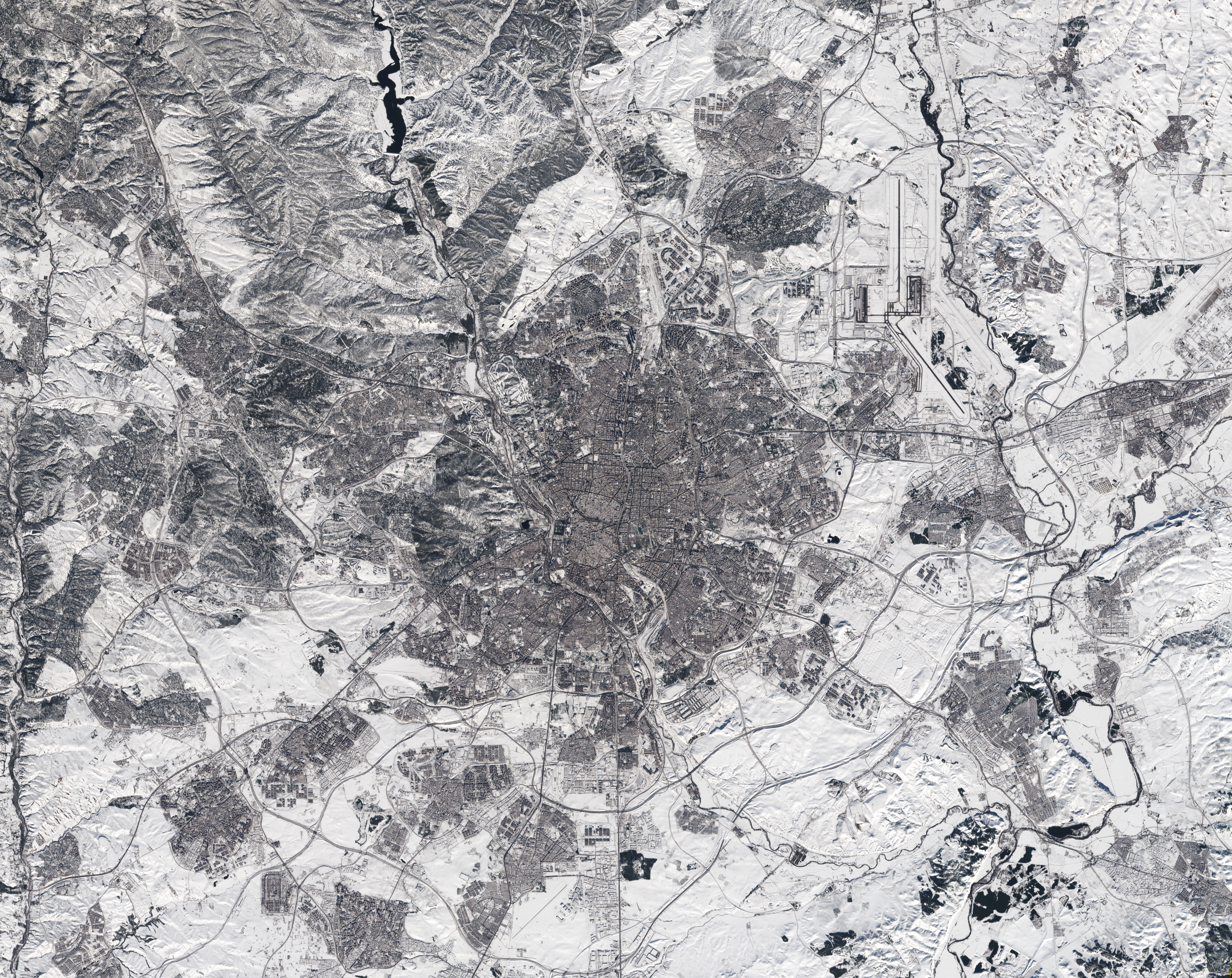
The snowfall as captured by the Sentinel-2 satellite of the European Space Agency on 11 January 2021

The majority of roads in Madrid still remained blocked by snow a week after the snowstorm, with small streets and the city periphery being particularly affected. Delays in clearing snow in the city led to closure of Madrid schools until the 20th of January. On the 16th of January, a body was found under the snow in Arganzuela district of Madrid.

The snowstorm fully paralyzed the waste collection service for 4 days. As of 15 January only a 13% of the 9,000 tonnes of litter accumulated on the streets had been removed.

The Mayor of Madrid, José Luis Martínez-Almeida required the Government of Spain for the declaration of Madrid as disaster area and numbered in 1,398 million euros the damages caused by the storm. The bill however also reportedly included the money foregone on parking meters and paddle tennis courts.

A presence of rodents was detected during the spillover of the Storm Filomena, as the waste collection service ceased to operate. By early February a plague of roof rats (black rats) was reported to have installed around the area of Méndez Álvaro.

== See also ==
- Storm Gloria – a similarly slow-moving extratropical cyclone in January 2020 which caused catastrophic flooding over the Iberian Peninsula.
