= Storm Gloria =

Extratropical cyclone which caused severe flooding in eastern Spain in early 2020

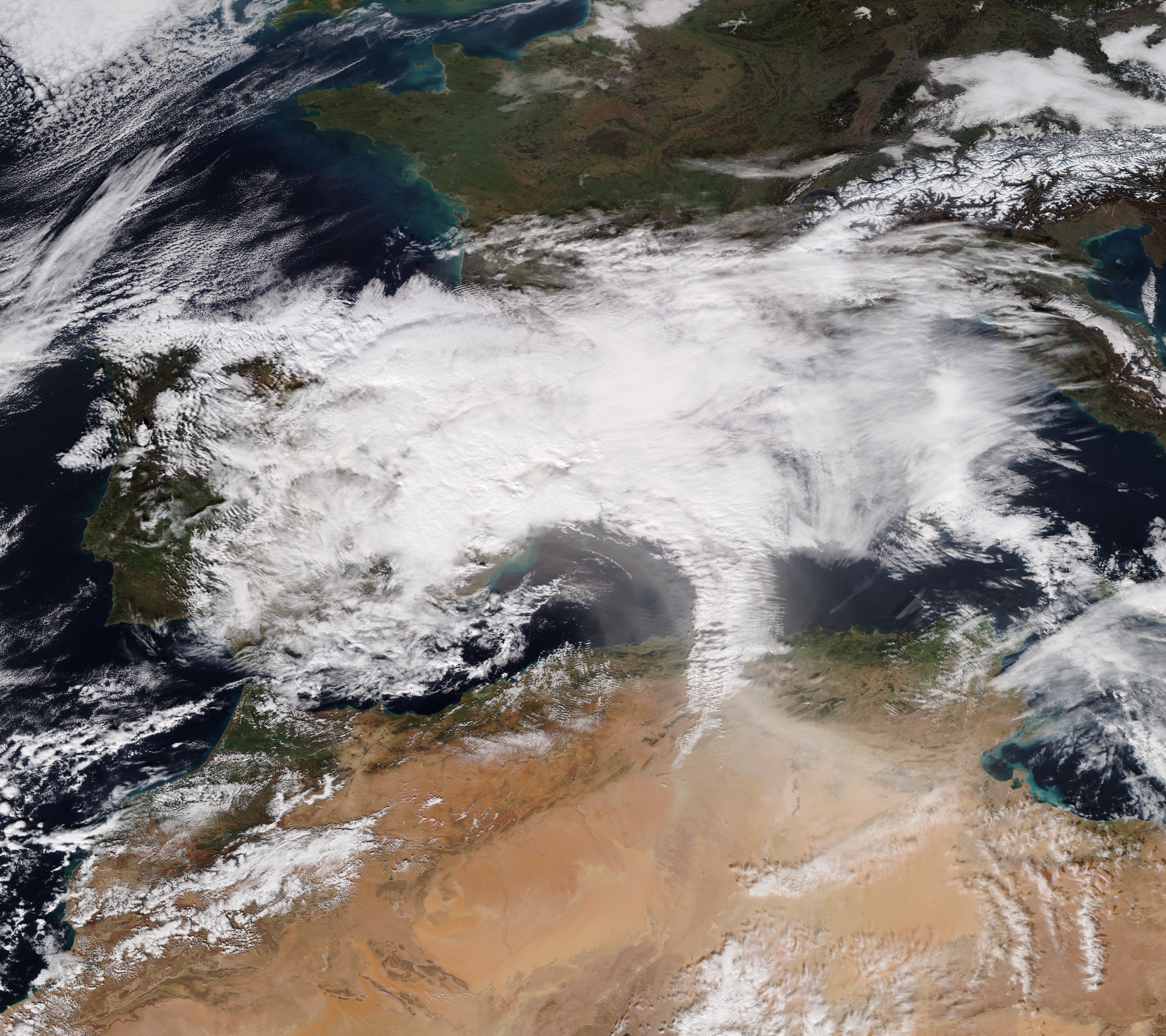
- Storm Gloria on 21 January while centred over the western Mediterranean Sea

Meteorological history
- Formed: 17 January 2020
- Dissipated: 25 January 2020

Extratropical cyclone Blizzard Mediterranean storm
- Highest winds: 62 mph (100 km/h); Mallorca, Spain
- Lowest pressure: 993 mb (29.3 inHg)
- Max. snowfall: 86 cm (34 in) at Vilafranca, Spain

Overall effects
- Fatalities: 14 fatalities + 3 missing
- Damage: At least $200 million (2020) (Note: Equivalent to £150 million or €180 million at 2020 exchange rates.)
- Areas affected: Spain, Portugal, France, Morocco, Gibraltar
- Power outages: 337,000+
- Part of the 2019–20 European windstorm season

Storm Gloria affected eastern Spain and southernmost France with high winds and heavy rainfall. The system was named Gloria by the Spanish meteorological agency AEMET on 18 January, becoming the tenth named storm of the 2019–20 European windstorm season. The Free University of Berlin named the system Ilka.

After making landfall and crossing northern Spain as a weak cyclone, Gloria stalled for several days over the western Mediterranean Sea, bringing heavy rainfall, snowfall and high winds to many areas across southern Europe and north Africa. Southeastern Spain and the Balearic Islands were particularly hard-hit by flooding associated with Gloria between 19 and 21 January. In total across Spain, 13 people were killed while four more remain missing.

== Meteorological history ==
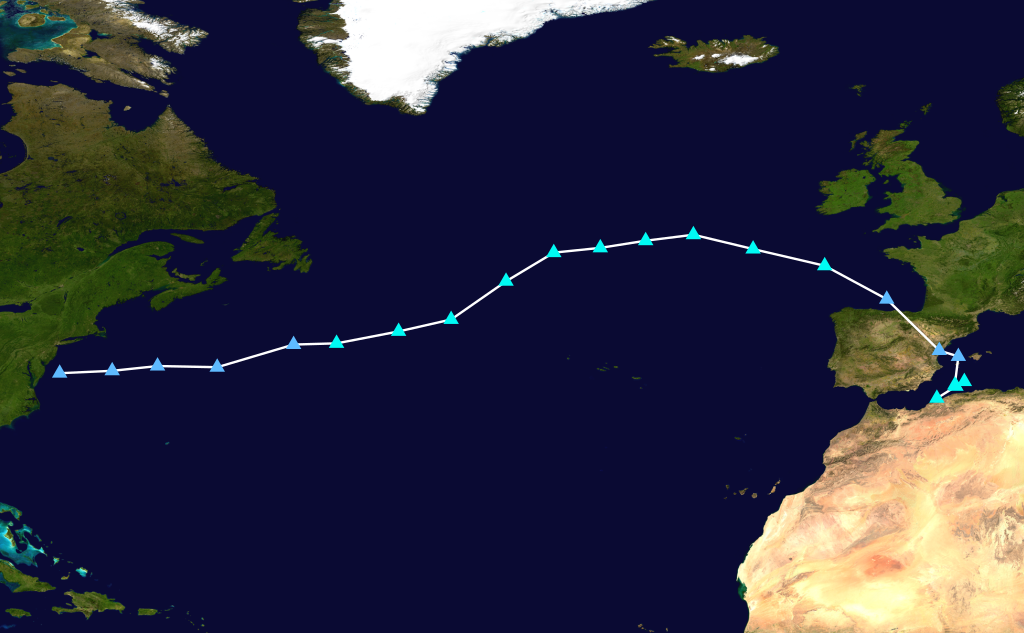
Map plotting the track of Gloria according to the Ocean Prediction Center Map key Saffir–Simpson scale Tropical depression (≤38 mph, ≤62 km/h) Tropical storm (39–73 mph, 63–118 km/h) Category 1 (74–95 mph, 119–153 km/h) Category 2 (96–110 mph, 154–177 km/h) Category 3 (111–129 mph, 178–208 km/h) Category 4 (130–156 mph, 209–251 km/h) Category 5 (≥157 mph, ≥252 km/h) Unknown Storm type Tropical cyclone Subtropical cyclone Extratropical cyclone, remnant low, tropical disturbance, or monsoon depression

The system that would eventually become Storm Gloria was first noted as a developing complex of low-pressure systems over the central United States on 9 January; the strongest of these organised sufficiently to be named Winter Storm Isaiah by The Weather Channel later that day. A large trough associated with Isaiah dug into the Southwestern United States from 10 January, providing a path for cold air that had been settled over Canada to move southwards and clash with warm, moist air moving northward from the Gulf of Mexico. In the warm sector of the system, severe thunderstorms and tornadoes developed across the south-central United States on the morning of 10 January. Isaiah continued to develop and intensify as it moved eastwards across the United States before exiting into the north Atlantic on 13 January.

After stalling off the coast of North America for several days, the system was first noted as Cyclone Ilka by the Free University of Berlin – who name all low-pressure areas affecting Europe – on 17 January, while moving steadily eastwards across the open Atlantic. AEMET, the Spanish meteorological agency, began issuing warnings on Storm Gloria on 18 January as the system was approaching the Iberian Peninsula. After turning southeastwards and entering the Bay of Biscay, Gloria subsequently made landfall close to Santander in northern Spain on 19 January.

Gloria quickly passed over northern Spain as a weak cyclone and then emerged into the western Mediterranean Sea, where it stalled for several days. After remaining nearly stationary near the Balearic Islands for around 48 hours, Gloria began to slowly drift southwards and then westwards, passing over the Strait of Gibraltar and northern Morocco on 22 January before emerging into the far eastern Atlantic on 23 January. After looping for several days offshore to the south and west of Portugal, Gloria dissipated on 25 January off the country's southern coast.

== Impact ==
=== Spain ===
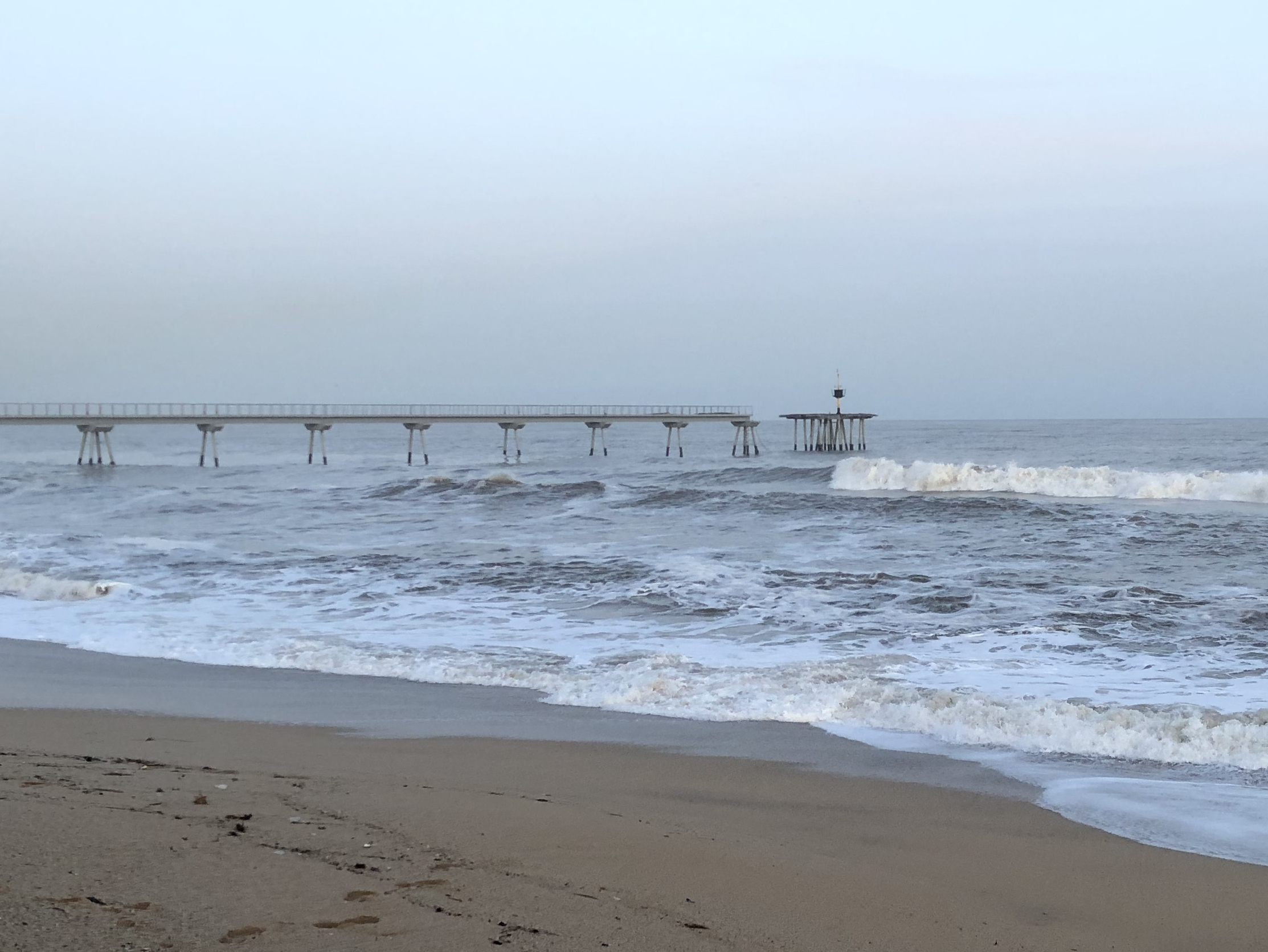
Damage to Pont del Petroli, a commercial pier near Barcelona.

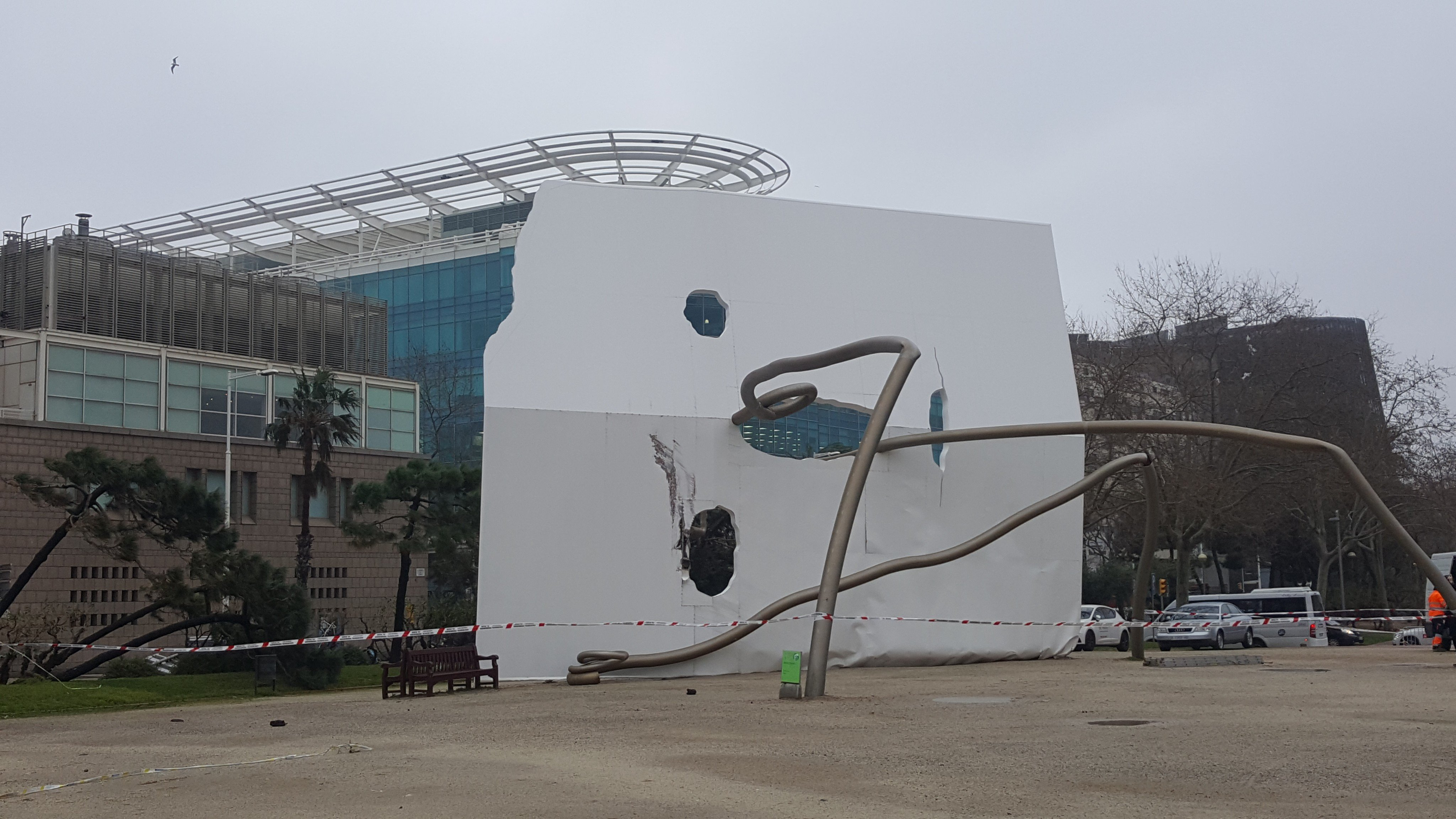
Wind damage from Storm Gloria in Barcelona.

After rapidly crossing the Atlantic, Gloria made landfall in northern Spain on 19 January with high winds and heavy rainfall, exacerbated by the system stalling off the east coast of Spain shortly after landfall. Heavy rainfall caused widespread flooding and mudslides which killed 14 people across the country and left three missing. Across the Balearic Islands, particularly on Mallorca, historic high winds caused widespread damage to houses, and many villages were evacuated. Catalonia, Valencia, Murcia and Andalusia on the southeastern mainland were all impacted by record-breaking rainfall totals and, over higher ground, heavy snowfall and blizzards.

In Alcoi, Alicante, a 75-year-old woman was killed when high winds caused her house to collapse while she was inside sheltering from the storm. A 50-year-old man was killed in L'Ametlla de Mar, Catalonia after being washed away from the shore whilst fishing, while the body of a man was discovered inside a car washed away by flooding in the nearby town of Cabacés. In Ávila, a 63-year-old man was struck and killed by flying roof tiles.

Gloria also caused a strong storm surge which caused flooding along the east coast of mainland Spain. The worst coastal flooding was reported around the Ebro river delta south of Barcelona, where the storm surge swept up to 3 kilometres (1.9 mi) inland through low-lying rice paddies. In Lloret de Mar and Tossa de Mar, sea foam whipped up by high winds moved inland from the beach, blocking streets. At the Port of Barcelona, waves crashed as high as 7 metres (23 ft) over defences, flooding coastal properties; several boats broke free from their moorings, and at least one sank entirely. Two people, including a British citizen, remain missing after being dragged out to sea on the island of Ibiza.

Heavy snowfall caused problems over higher ground inland. Alicante Airport was closed after heavy snowfall blocked the runway, while heavy snowfall was also reported over the Pyrenees and near Madrid and Valencia, where a 54-year-old homeless woman died from hypothermia. Another hypothermia-related death was reported in Moixent, while blizzard conditions resulted in a single fatality in a road accident in Asturias. Severe weather conditions caused widespread school closures, with 130,000 students missing classes across Catalonia alone.

=== France ===
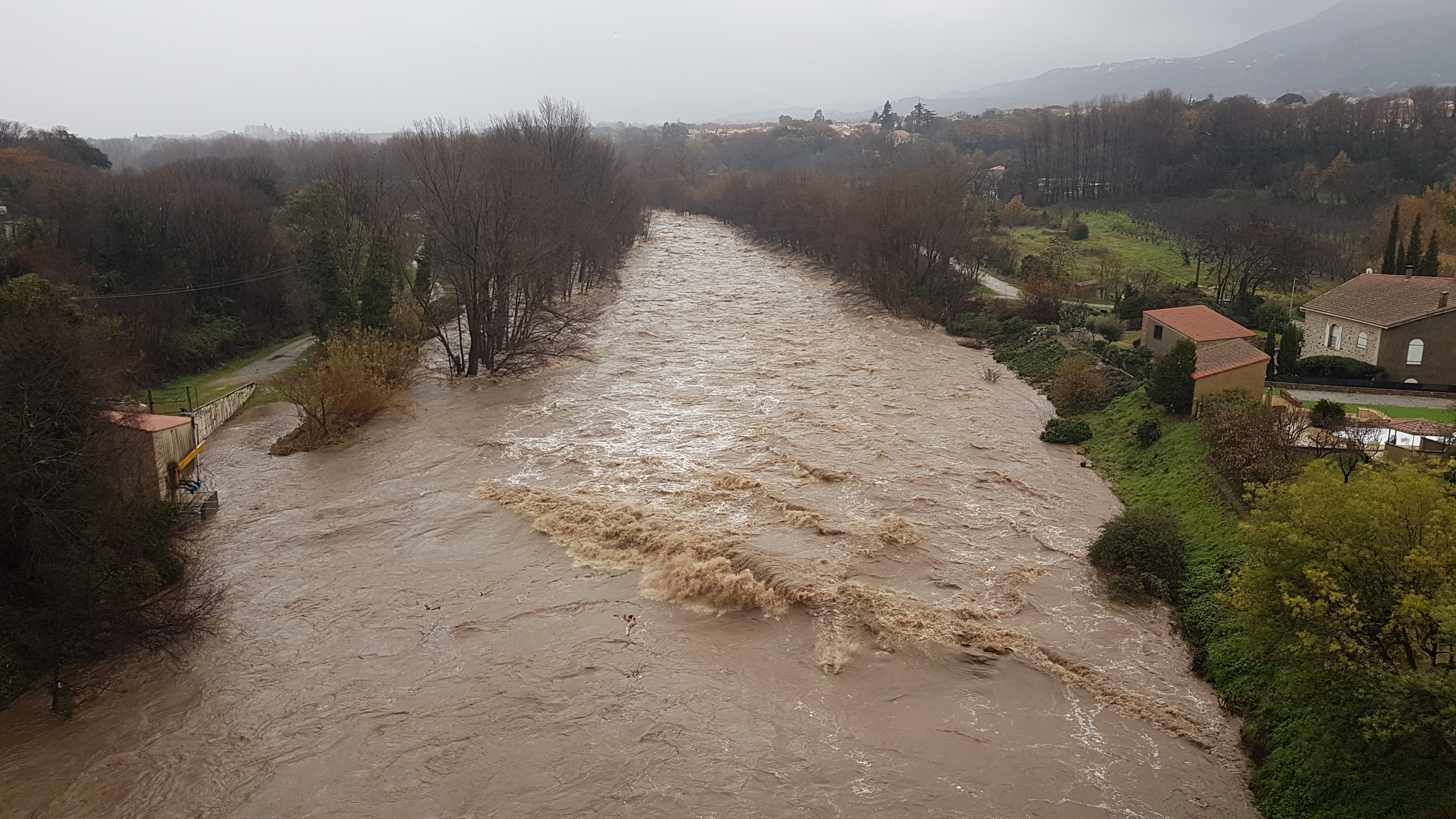
Heavy rainfall caused flooding of several rivers in southern France, including the River Tech.

Storm Gloria was the worst storm to affect the department Pyrénées-Orientales in southern France since January 1982. Flooding was reported in the Pyrénées-Orientales department of southern France between 19 and 21 January, as Gloria stalled just offshore to the south; dozens of extra police and firefighters were deployed to the area, and the A9 motorway was closed as a precaution prior to Gloria's arrival.

Red flood warnings, the highest level, were issued prior to the storm for the Aude and Agly Rivers, later extended to also include the Ariège and Hers-Vif; flooding was also reported along the River Tech. Severe river flooding and landslides resulted in the evacuation of 2,000 homes across southern France. High winds and flooding disrupted electricity supplies, leaving 23,000 homes without power at the height of the storm.

The route nationale N116 road was closed between Fontpédrouse and Mont-Louis after heavy rainfall caused a landslide which blocked an irrigation canal adjacent to the roadway, subsequently causing the road to be blocked by flooding. This flooding caused further landslides alongside the road, which in turn caused severe damage to the road surface; it remained closed for over three weeks after the storm for landslide repairs.

== Records ==
Storm Gloria set numerous meteorological records in Spain across a range of categories. Between 19 and 23 January, seven separate weather stations across the country recorded more than 300 mm (12 in) of rain. During this time period the station at Barx set the highest total of 433 mm (17.0 in), more than four times the total monthly average rainfall for the month of January at this location. At Málaga Airport, 21 mm (0.83 in) of rainfall was recorded in one hour, and 265 mm (10.4 in) in total between 22 and 25 January. Storm Gloria set new rainfall records at the Daroca and Tortosa weather stations that were more than double the previous record.

On 20 January, significant wave heights in the western Mediterranean Sea – a measure of the mean height of the highest third of any set of waves – reached 8.44 m (27.7 ft) at a buoy off the coast of Valencia, breaking the previous record significant wave height for the entire Mediterranean of 8.15 m (26.7 ft) registered near Mahón in January 2003. Since this is a mean value, individual wave heights were even higher – a buoy near Dragonera recorded a maximum wave height of 14.2 m (47 ft) during the storm.

At Vilafranca, 86 cm (34 in) of snow fell on 21 January alone, breaking the Spanish national record for the heaviest recorded snowfall in a 24-hour period; this previously stood at 80 cm (31 in) at the same site, recorded on 7 March 1968. Also on 21 January, there were 3,035 recorded lightning strikes in the Valencian Community alone, the highest-ever daily lightning strike count for that province.

== See also ==
- Storm Filomena (2021), a similarly slow-moving extratropical cyclone which affected the Iberian Peninsula with record snowfall one year after Gloria.
- Similar flood events in southern Europe:
  - 1957 Valencia flood
  - Autumn 2000 Western Europe floods
  - Hurricane Vince (2005)
  - 2018 European floods
  - Storm Alex (2020)
