= 2020–21 European windstorm season =

- First storm formed: 30 September 2020
- Last storm dissipated: 1 August 2021
- Strongest storm^{1}: Bella; 956 mbar (28.2 inHg)
- Strongest wind gust: Barbara; 216 km/h (134 mph) Iraty, France
- Total storms: 14
- Total fatalities: 20 (+1 missing)
- ^{1}Strongest storm is determined by lowest pressure and maximum recorded non-mountainous wind gust is also included for reference.

The 2020–2021 European windstorm season was the sixth instance of seasonal European windstorm naming in Europe. It was the second season in which the Netherlands participated, joining Ireland's and the United Kingdom's meteorological agencies. The season consisted of the year from 1 September 2020 to 31 August 2021. The Portuguese, Spanish, and French meteorological agencies collaborated too, joined by the Belgian meteorological agency.

== Background and naming ==
In 2015, the Met Office and Met Éireann announced a pilot project to name storm warnings, as part of the "Name our Storms" project for wind storms, and asked the public for suggestions. The meteorological offices produced a full list of names for 2015–2016 through to 2017–2018, common to both the United Kingdom and Ireland, with the Netherlands taking part from 2019 onwards. Names in the United Kingdom will be based on the National Severe Weather Warning Service when a storm is assessed to have the potential for an Amber ('be prepared') or Red ('take action (danger to life)') warning.

There are two main naming lists: one created by the national meteorological agencies of the United Kingdom, Ireland, and the Netherlands, and another created by the equivalent agencies from France, Spain, Portugal, and Belgium. Additionally, former Atlantic hurricanes will retain their names as assigned by the National Hurricane Center of the United States.

Some of the storms may be of tropical origins. For example, ex-Hurricane Lorenzo of 2019 made landfall in Ireland and the United Kingdom. All details on tropical storms and hurricanes can be found on the National Hurricane Centre.

=== Western group (United Kingdom, Ireland and the Netherlands) ===
The following names were selected for the 2020–2021 season.

- Aiden
- Bella
- Christoph
- Darcy
- Evert
- Fleur (unused)
- Gavin (unused)
- Heulwen (unused)
- Iain (unused)
- Julia (unused)
- Klaas (unused)
- Lilah (unused)
- Minne (unused)
- Naia (unused)
- Oscar (unused)
- Phoebe (unused)
- Ravi (unused)
- Saidhbhín (unused)
- Tobias (unused)
- Veronica (unused)
- Wilson (unused)

=== South western group (France, Spain, Portugal and Belgium) ===
The 2020-2021 European windstorm season was the fourth year in which the meteorological agencies of France, Spain and Portugal were naming storms that affected their areas. The naming scheme partially overlaps that used by the United Kingdom, Ireland and the Netherlands, as storms named by the other group of agencies are used reciprocally.

- Alex
- Barbara
- Clement
- Dora
- Ernest
- Filomena
- Gaetan
- Hortense
- Ignacio
- Justine
- Karim
- Lola
- Mathieu (unused)
- Nadia (unused)
- Octave (unused)
- Paula (unused)
- Rodrigo (unused)
- Sofia (unused)
- Tristan (unused)
- Vivian (unused)
- Walter (unused)

== Storms ==
=== Storm Alex ===
Storm Alex
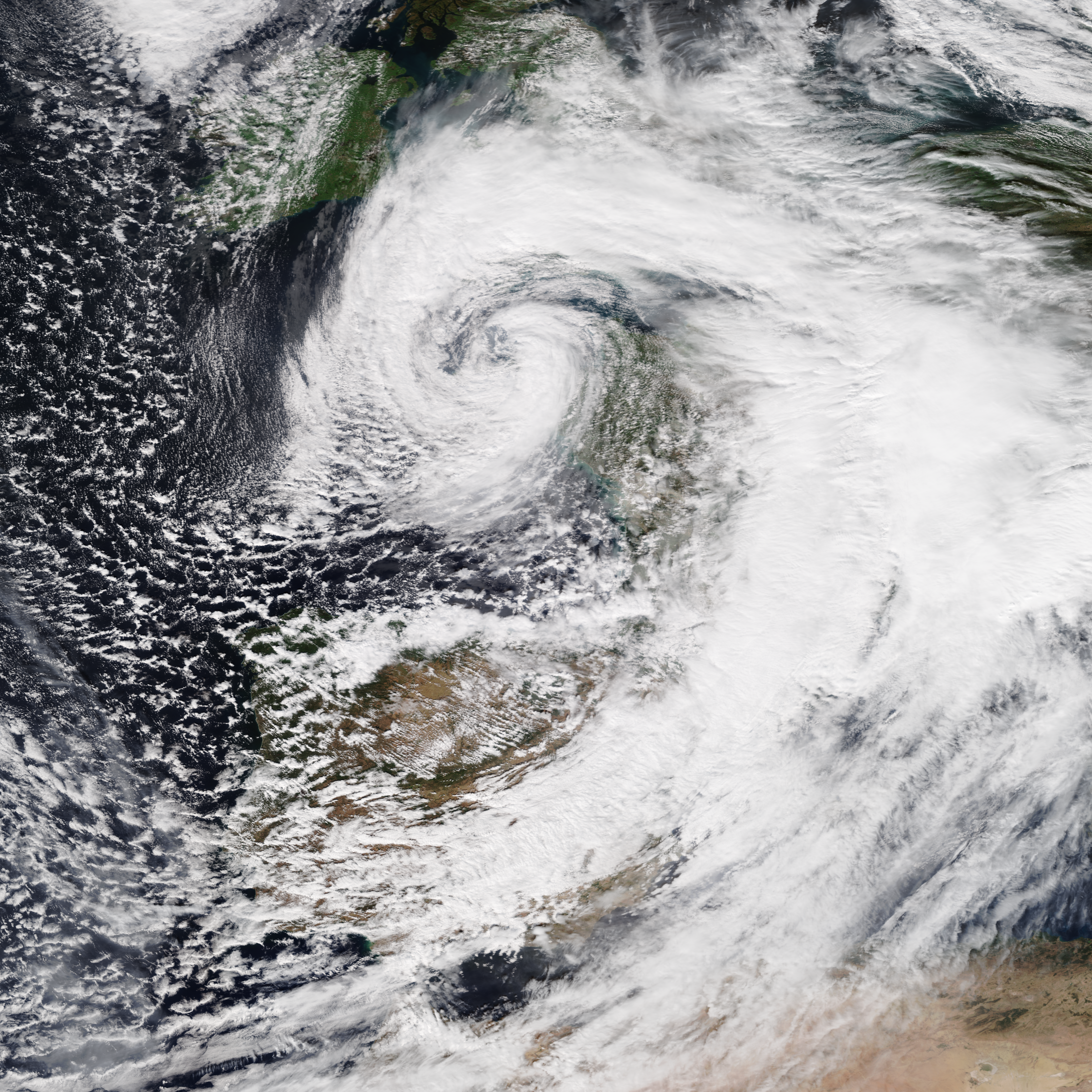
- Storm Alex coming ashore in Brittany at peak intensity on 2 October 2020
- Area affected: United Kingdom, Channel Islands, Spain, France, Italy, Austria, Poland, Czech Republic
- Date of impact: 30 September – 3 October 2020
- Maximum wind gust: 186 km/h (116 mph; 100 kn) Belle-Île, France
- Lowest pressure: 967 hPa (28.6 inHg)
- Fatalities: 16 + (1 missing)
- Power outages: 115,000+
- Damage: Undetermined

Storm Alex, named by AEMET and Météo-France on 30 September, formed near Brittany on 1 October after undergoing explosive cyclogenesis. Because of this storm, one department in France, the Morbihan, was upgraded to the red alert for strong winds at 4:00 pm Central Time.

Alex caused much damage in the department of the Morbihan. Trees were blown down and roads and railways were closed due to flooding and the trees which were downed by the strong winds. Around 100,000 power outages were reported in Brittany. Météo-France observed local strong winds over land (142 km/h (88 mph; 77 kn) in Granville, 132 km/h (82 mph; 71 kn) in Sarzeau, 131 km/h (81 mph; 71 kn) in Vannes, 80 mph (129 km/h) in Cholet).

The storm led to advection of Mediterranean air northwards where it interacted with the coastal topography producing a heavy rainfall in southeast France, known as a "Mediterranean Episode". The department of the Alpes-Maritimes was issued with a red alert for high amounts of rain and flooding. Météo-France reported a maximum of 571 mm (22.5 in) in 24 hours in Mons. More generally, 250 to 300 millimetres (9.8 to 11.8 in) were reported in the department of the Alpes-Maritimes. Météo-France also reported 60 to 100 mm (2.4 to 3.9 in) in departments of the Drôme, Ardèche, Rhône, Ain, Saône-et-Loire, Jura and Côte-d'Or. 104 mm (4.1 in) in 24 hours in La Rochepot, Côte-d'Or, set a new a record for Burgundy in October. At least 6 people were reported dead; 1 in Brest and 5 in the Alpes-Maritimes with 7 missing in total and for a dozen others families and authorities don't have any news. In Italy, 2 deaths were reported with 1 person missing. Strong gusts caused one death in each of Austria, Poland and Czech Republic.

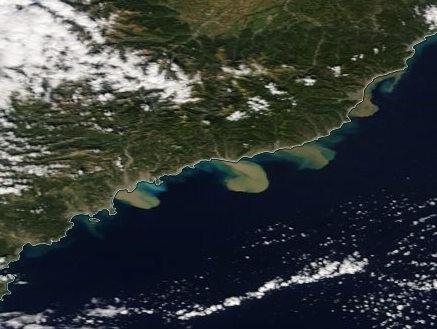
Sediment plumes in the Mediterranean Sea following devastating flooding in SE France linked to storm Alex

Many yellow and amber weather warnings were issued in the United Kingdom for strong winds and heavy rain. As of 21:00 BST, the Met Office reported the maximum rainfall total to be 78 mm (3.1 in) at Liss, Hampshire, with the maximum gust of 71 mph (114 km/h; 62 kn) being recorded at Berry Head, Devon. Many of the fatalities were caused by the ensuing landslides.

On 5 October 2020, the death toll of the floods affecting France and Italy rose to 7 as three bodies were found in Nice, bringing the death toll in France to four, meanwhile there were three dead people in Italy. The region of Piedmont witnessed levels of rain not recorded since 1958, in which it reached a record 630 mm (25 in) of rain in Sambughetto in just 24 hours. By 6 October, the death toll reached 12 with a further 20 still missing, as there were another five dead people in Italy, including a worker who was found in the Italian region of Liguria, having gone missing during the beginning of the floods. Moreover, cemeteries in Saint-Martin-Vésubie and Tende were partially washed out by the floods, in addition to seven Canadian black wolves which were lost from a wildlife park in Nice. Monaco's Minister of State Pierre Dartout announced that €4m would be distributed to the affected regions including French communities in Alpes-Maritimes and Italian municipality of Ventimiglia. Another 3 people were found dead, and another person went missing, bringing the number of missing people to 21, and the death toll to 15 individuals as of 7 October. By 3 October, one more individual had gone missing, but the other 21 missing people were found safe and rescued, bringing the number of missing persons to 1 individual. In addition, an Italian firefighter was killed by a falling branch.

=== Storm Barbara ===
Storm Barbara
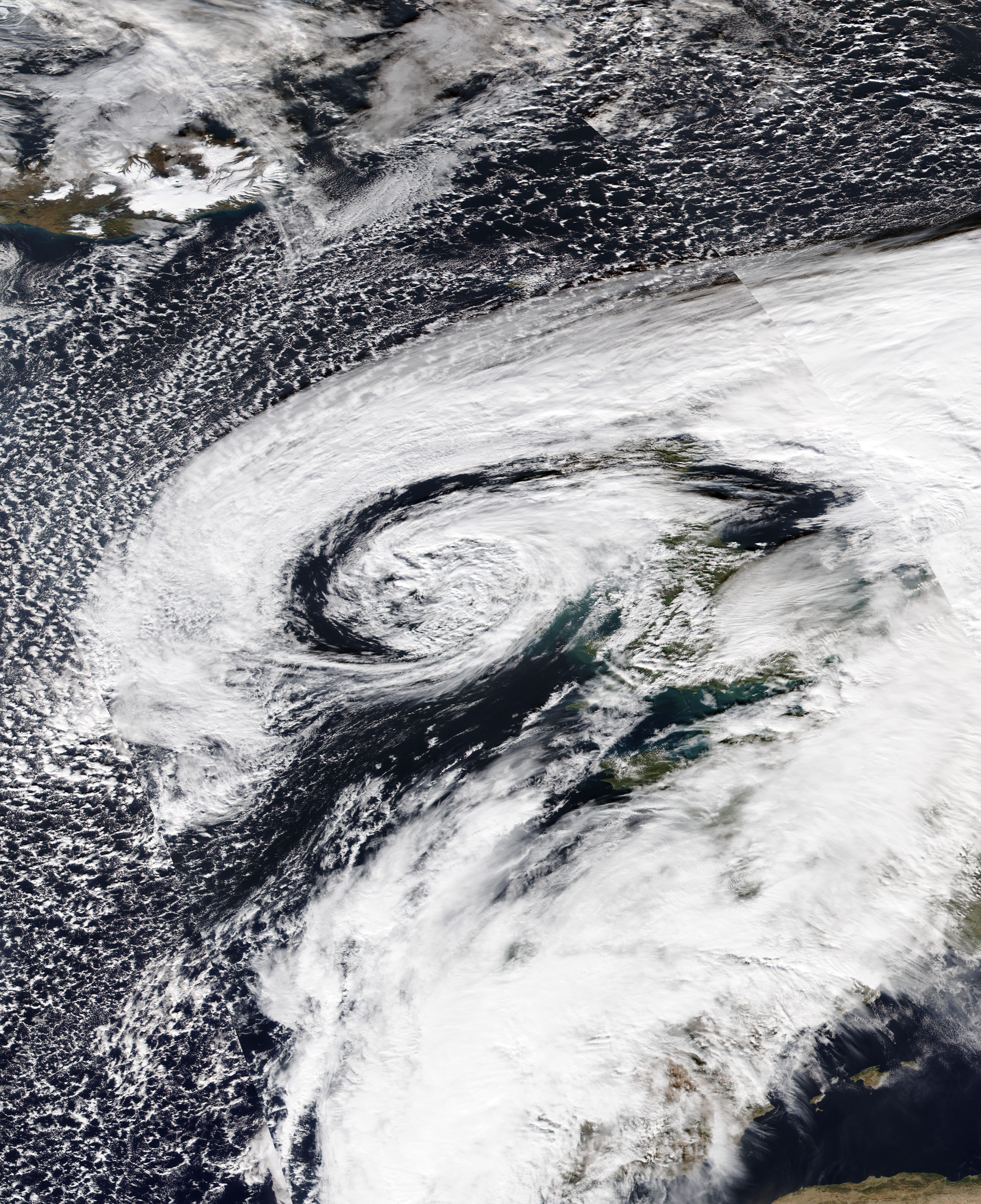
- Area affected: United Kingdom, Spain, Portugal
- Date of impact: 20 – 22 October 2020
- Maximum wind gust: 216 km/h (134 mph; 117 kn) Iraty, France
- Lowest pressure: 990 mbar (29 inHg)
- Fatalities: 1 total
- Power outages: Unspecified
- Damage: Undetermined

Barbara developed from a wave on a front trailing from a complex of low-pressure southwest of Portugal on 19 October. It moved northwest over the Iberian peninsula into the Bay of Biscay, moving into the English Channel and over the North Sea, then into Scandinavia, bringing heavy rain and, in some places, their first snow of the season.

Strong gusts and some damages was reported by the Meteo-France in association with the storm over parts of Spain, Portugal and France. Over 76,000 households in the latter's southwestern region lost power alone, while also causing significant damage to the electricity department. Numerous trees and power poles were also downed due to strong winds. It also killed an individual in Digoin, Burgundy when a tree collapsed on him in his garden. Total damages from the storm were estimated at greater than $50 million.

=== Storm Aiden ===
Storm Aiden
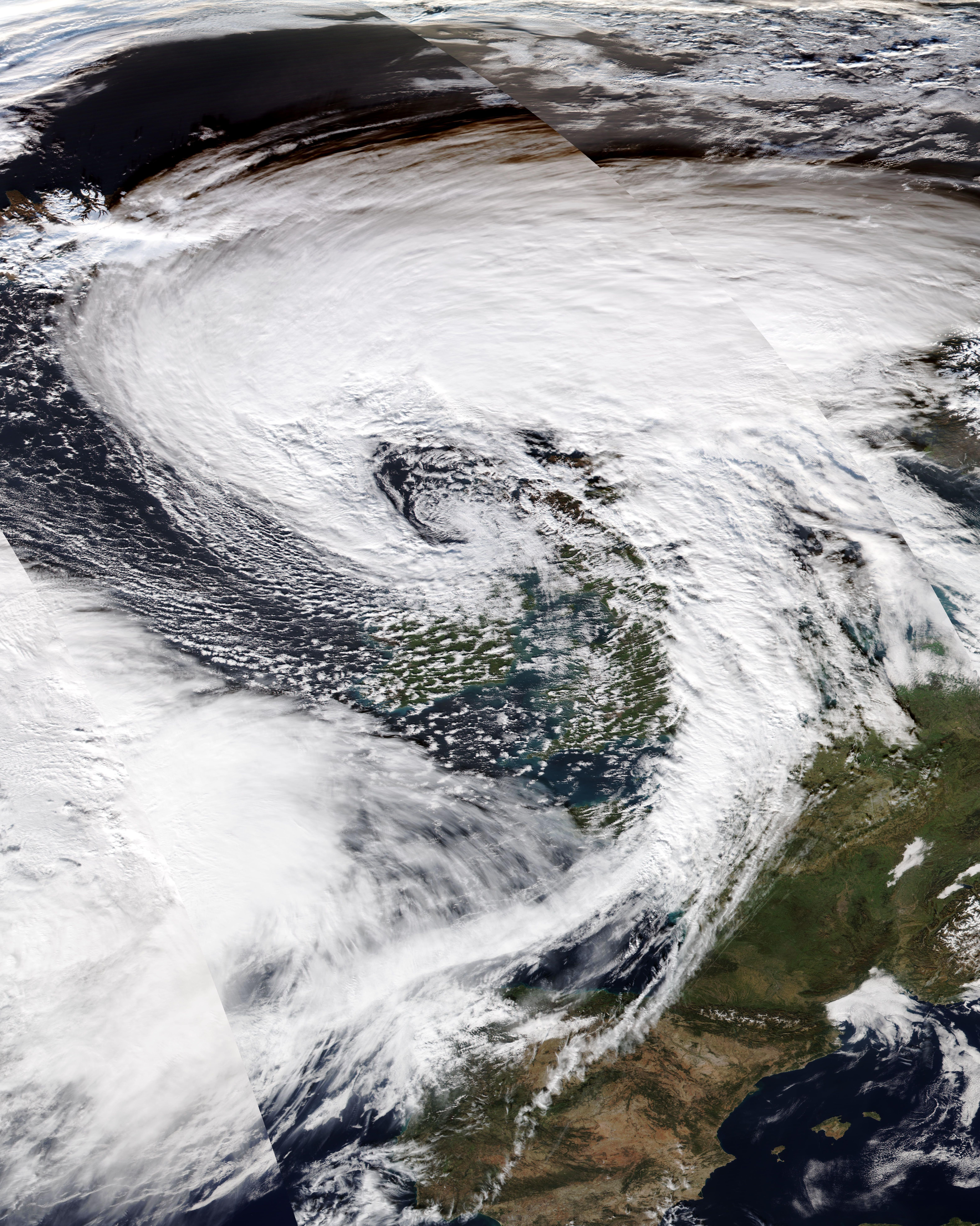
- Area affected: United Kingdom, Ireland
- Date of impact: 30 October – 2 November 2020
- Maximum wind gust: 130 km/h (81 mph; 70 kn) Malin Head, Ireland
- Lowest pressure: 974 hPa (28.8 inHg)
- Fatalities: 0
- Power outages: 8,000+
- Damage: Undetermined

Storm Aiden was named by Met Éireann senior executive Aidan McLaughlin on 30 October 2020.

On 30 October, Met Éireann issued a Status Orange wind warning for counties Kerry, Cork, Waterford, Wexford, Kilkenny, Carlow and Wicklow, valid between 31 October 2020 05:00 and 31 October 2020 10:00. An additional Status Orange wind warning was issued for counties Donegal, Sligo, Mayo, Galway and Clare, valid between 31 October 2020 08:00 and 31 October 2020 16:00. In both warnings, mean wind speeds of 65 to 80 km/h (40 to 50 mph; 35 to 43 kn) were expected, with severe and damaging gusts of up to 130 km/h (81 mph; 70 kn) also expected. A Status Yellow wind warning was issued for all remaining counties, valid between 31 October 2020 01:00 and 31 October 2020 15:00.

Over 8,000 homes and businesses were left without power as the storm battered the country with severe gusts of up to 130 km/h (81 mph; 70 kn) at Malin Head, Ireland, which led to fallen trees and flooding. The highest gust in the UK was 79 mph (127 km/h) at Altnaharra, Sutherland.

=== Storm Clement ===
Storm Clement
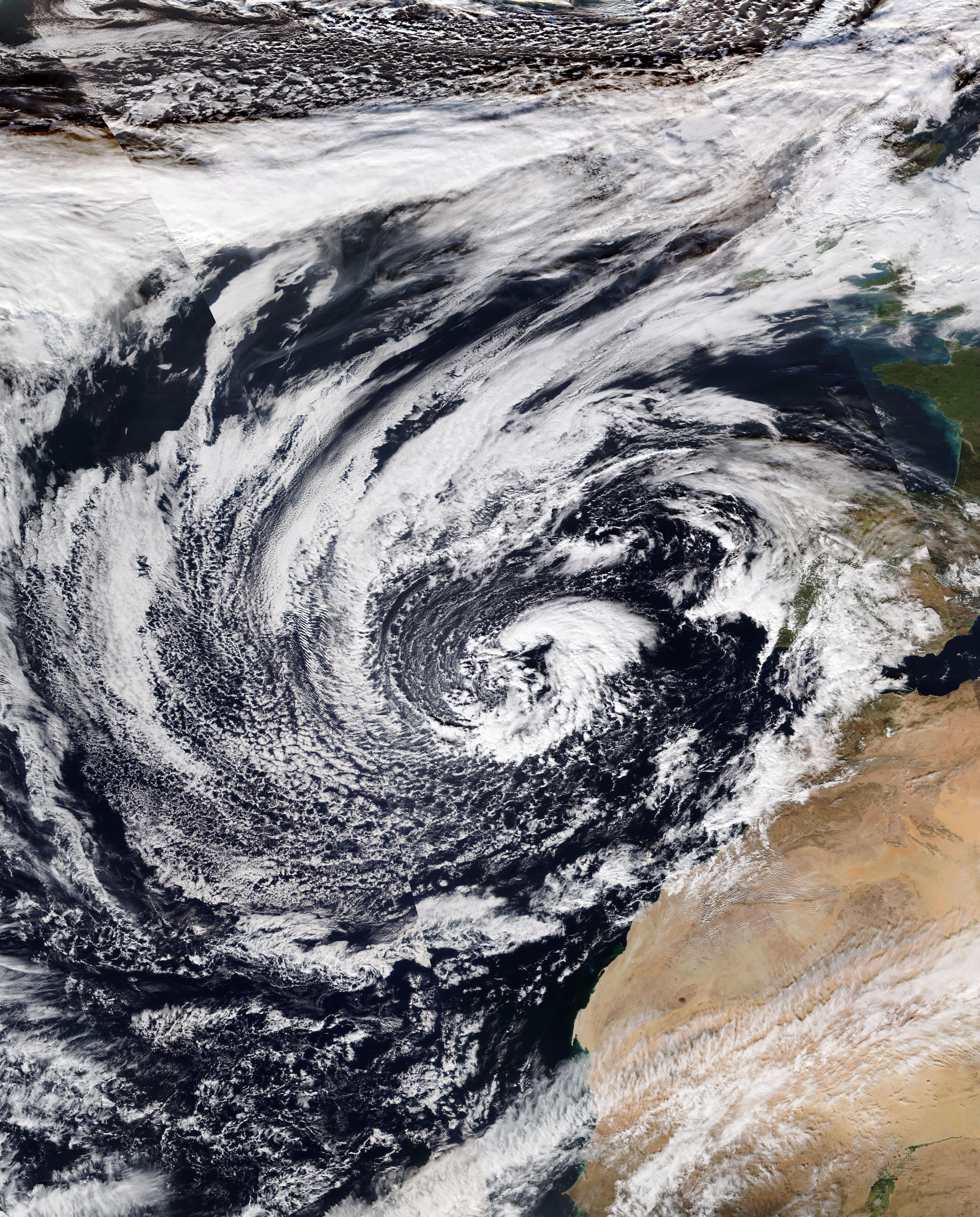

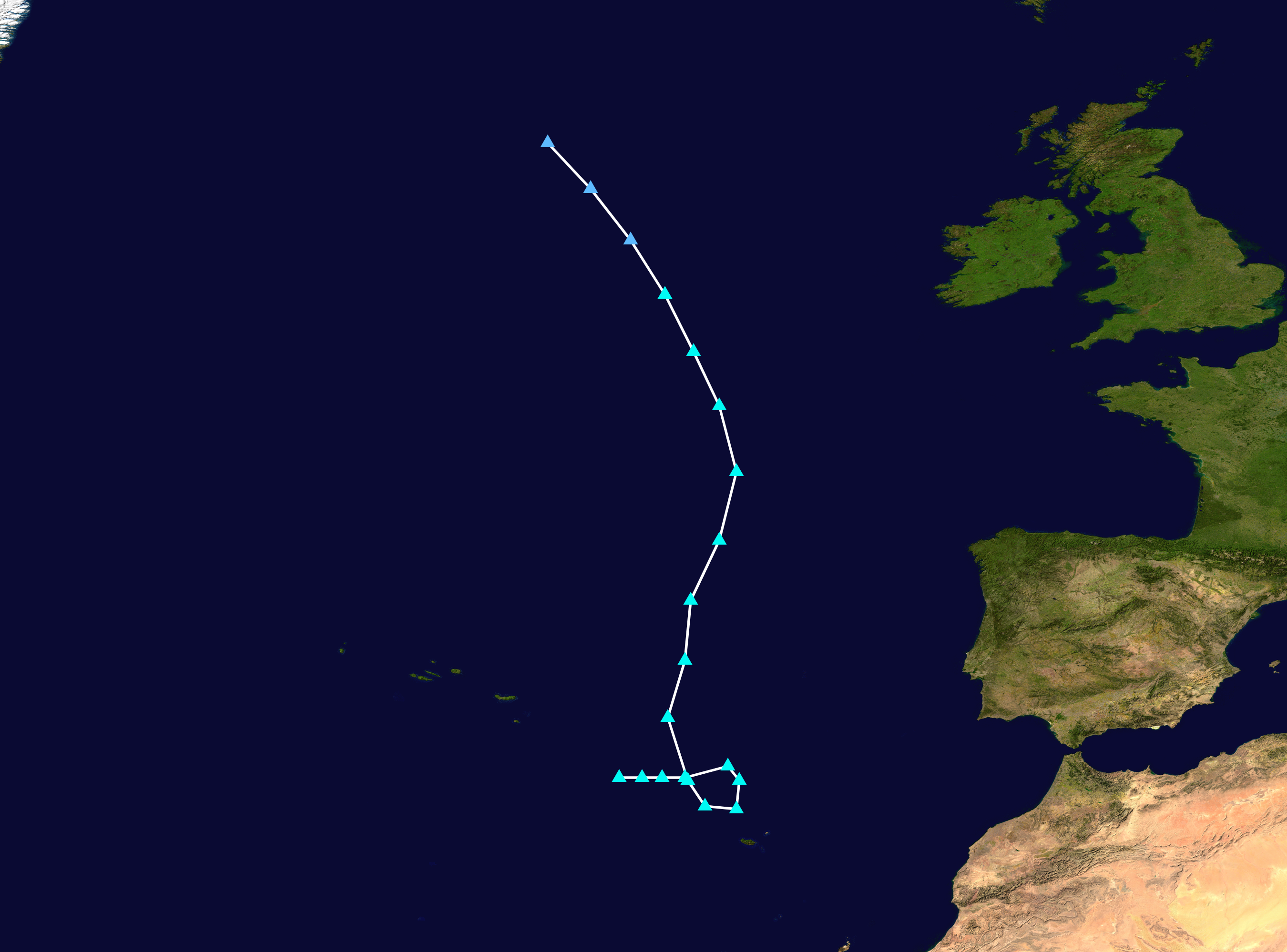
- Area affected: United Kingdom, Iberian Peninsula, Azores Islands, Canary Islands, Madeira Islands
- Date of impact: 27 November – 2 December 2020
- Lowest pressure: 993 millibars (29.3 inHg)

Storm Clement was named by AEMET on 27 November. It was located near the Azores Islands when it was named. By 28 November, Clement had moved slightly farther south and was affecting the Canary and Madeira Islands. The storm stalled, keeping the worst conditions away from mainland Europe. Portugal and some parts of Western Spain did see Clement's outer bands. The NHC was also monitoring the system for tropical or subtropical development. After stalling for about 4 days, the system dissipated on 2 December.

=== Storm Dora ===
Storm Dora
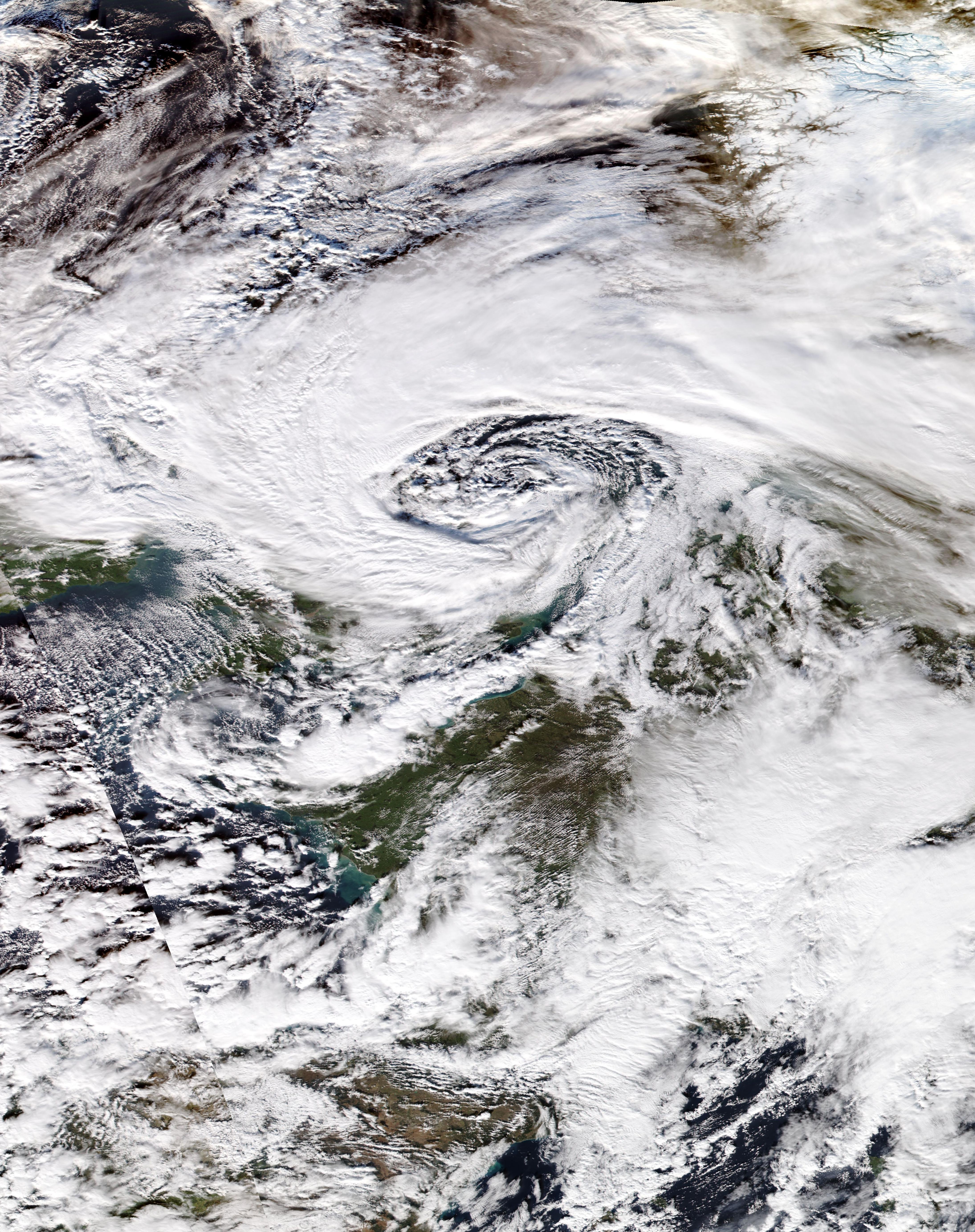
- Area affected: United Kingdom, France, Iberian Peninsula, Southern Scandinavia
- Date of impact: 3 – 5 December 2020
- Lowest pressure: Unspecified
- Fatalities: Unspecified
- Power outages: Unspecified
- Damage: Undetermined

Storm Dora was named on 2 December. It brought rain and snow to the UK, France, the Iberian Peninsula, and parts of Scandinavia. Areas closest to the coast saw some winds of more than 100 km/h (62 mph; 54 kn). By late 4 December, the system had become very disorganized, and early on 5 December was absorbed by another low-pressure system, which was named Xunav by the Free University of Berlin.

=== Storm Ernest ===
Storm Ernest
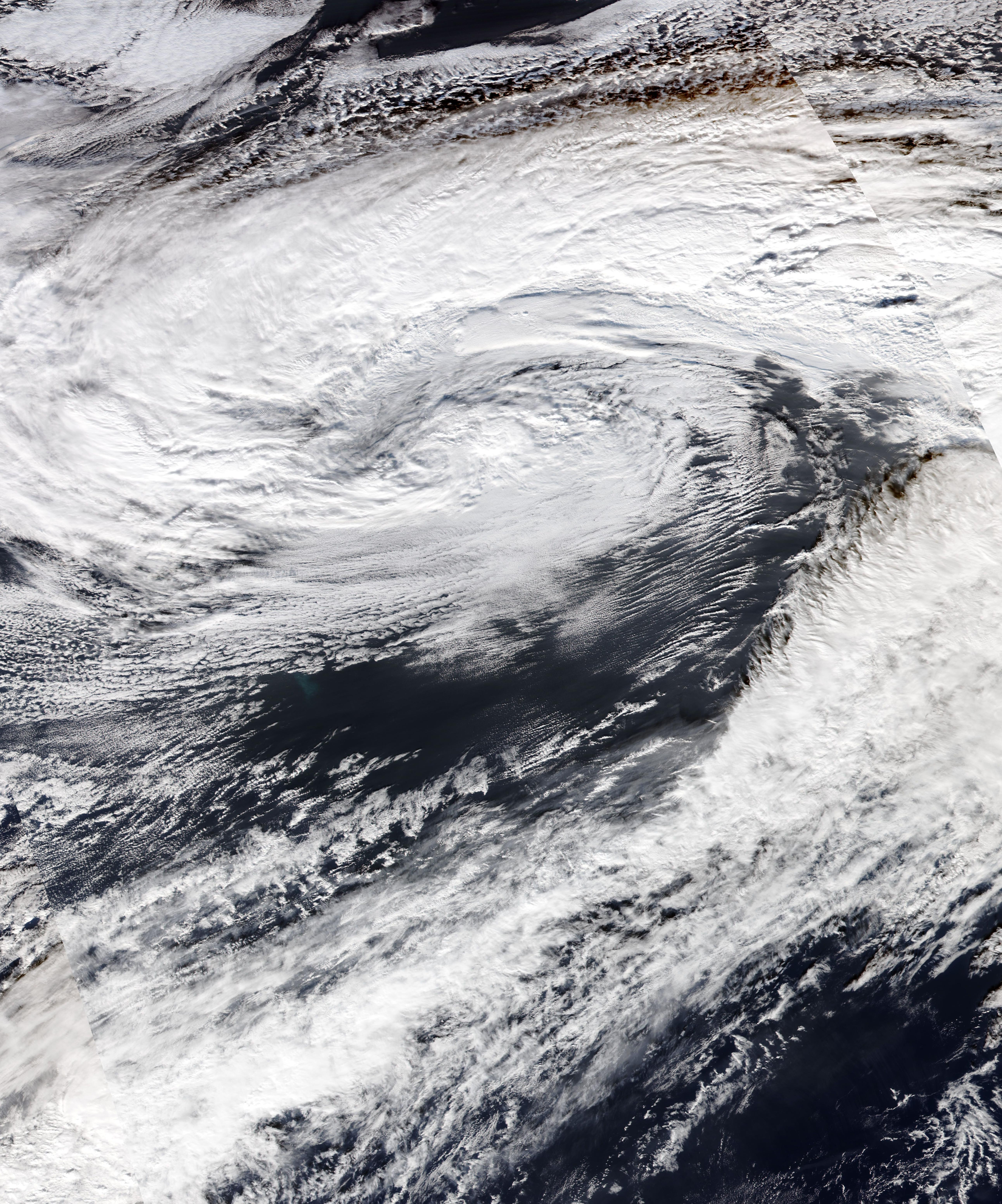
- Area affected: Spain, France, Switzerland, Italy, Balkans, Russia, Belarus, Baltics
- Date of impact: 7 – 12 December 2020
- Lowest pressure: Unspecified
- Fatalities: Unspecified
- Power outages: Unspecified
- Damage: Undetermined

Storm Ernest was named on 7 December by AEMET and Meteo France. It moved over the Bay of Biscay and then onto land bringing rain and wind to Northern Spain and the South of France. Its impacts then moved toward Italy and Switzerland, bringing rain and as well as snow in the mountains, but weaker winds. After reaching the shores of Italy, the system turned toward the northeast. Its rain then affected the Balkan countries and brought snow and/or mixed precipitation to parts of Belarus, Russia, and the Baltics, with its centre over Romania and Bulgaria. The system dissipated by 12 December.

=== Storm Bella ===
Storm Bella
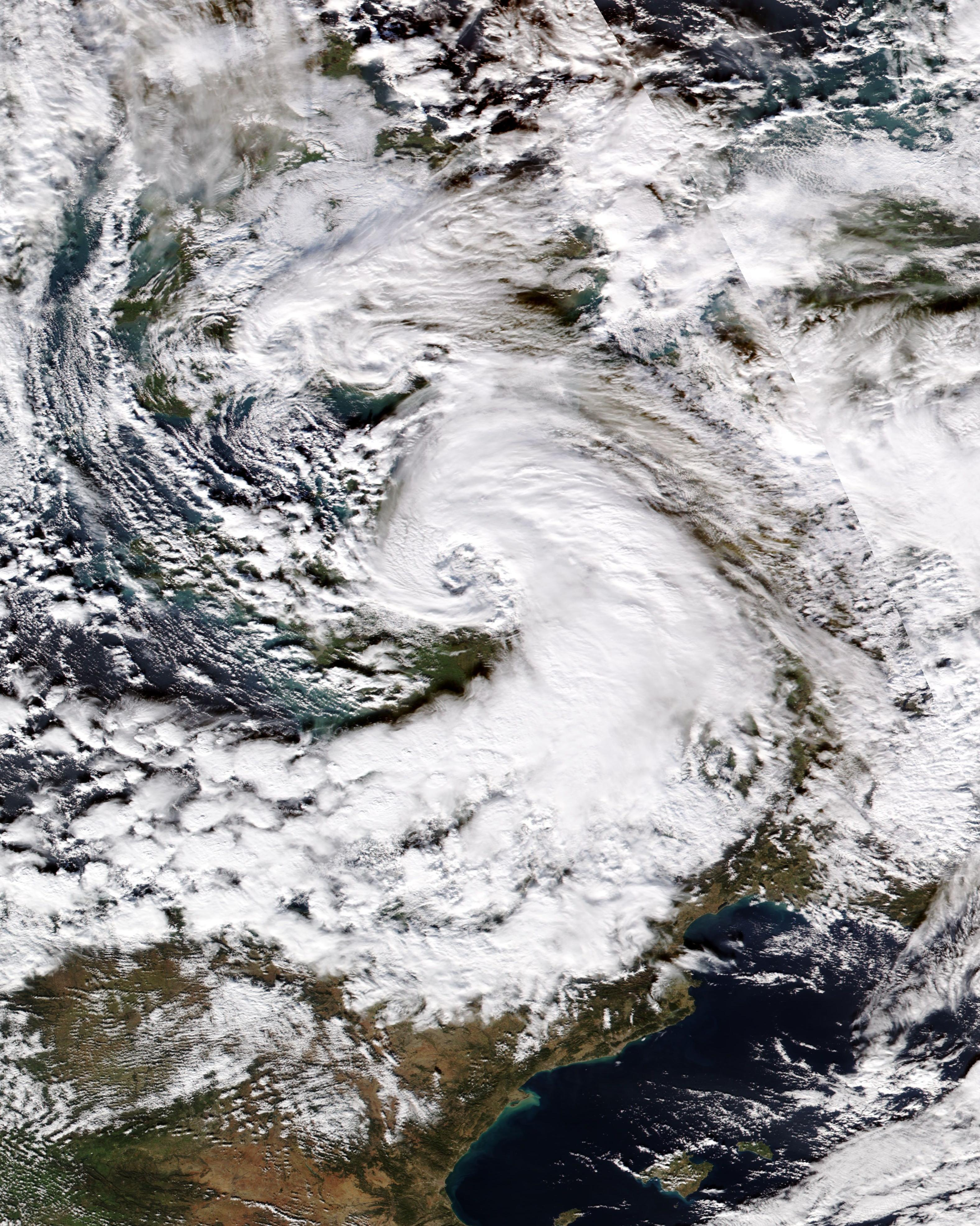
- Area affected: Ireland, United Kingdom, France, Scandinavia, Netherlands
- Date of impact: 25 – 31 December 2020
- Maximum wind gust: 171 km/h (106 mph) Needles, Isle of Wight
- Lowest pressure: 956 hPa (28.2 inHg)
- Power outages: 54,000+

Storm Bella was named on 25 December by the Met Office. It hit the UK and the Netherlands, bringing wind gusts of up to 117 km/h (73 mph; 63 kn) or more. There is also the threat of flooding, which has forced many people to evacuate their homes. The system was notably large, since the low pressure covered most of the area between Greenland's east coast and Norway's west coast and the area between Svalbard and Scotland on 25 December. The Norwegian coast was affected, causing much of the region to have a White Christmas. After making landfall, the weakening system turned north, and eventually dissipated in Central Scandinavia.

=== Storm Filomena ===
Storm Filomena
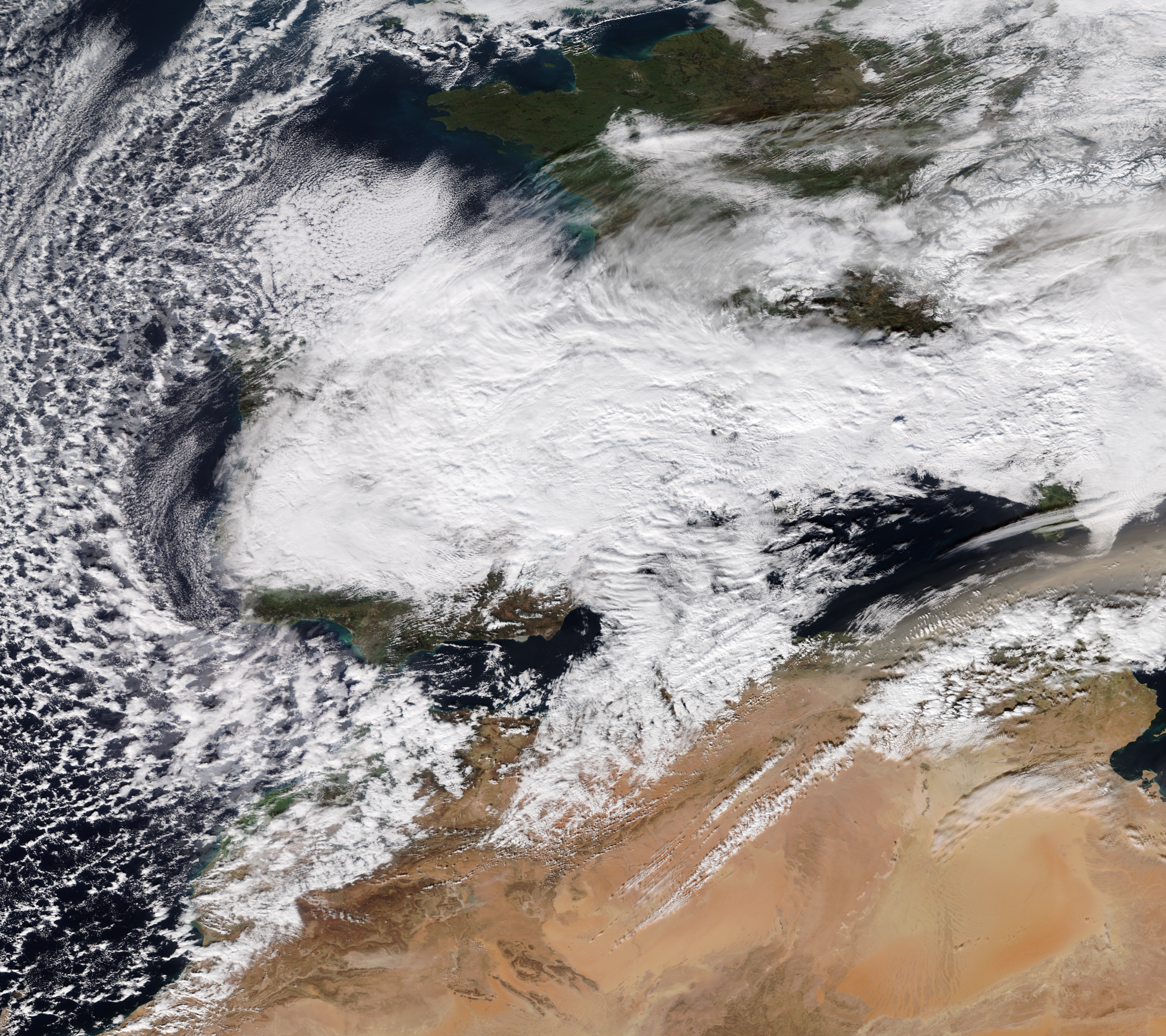
- Area affected: Iberian Peninsula, Morocco
- Date of impact: 5–13 January 2021
- Fatalities: 4+
- Damage: Undetermined

Storm Filomena was named by AEMET (Spanish: Agencia Estatal de Meteorología) on 5 January. It started as one system that split into two systems and hit Spain and Portugal back to back from 6 to 9 January. Near the coasts, wind gusts of up to 50 mph (80 km/h) occurred, as well as 1–2 in (2.5–5.1 cm) of rain. Further inland and in higher elevations, snowfalls of up to 2 ft (0.61 m) occurred, with areas of the city of Madrid receiving snow accumulation of up to 24 in (61 cm). According to AEMET, Filomena was the largest snowstorm in Spain since 1971. In the mountains, wind gusts of up to 75 mph (121 km/h) accompanied the large snow totals. Due to the unprecedented amount of snowfall, some unsuspecting motorists were trapped on the roads for hours. 4 deaths have also been reported; two in Malaga due to flooding, and two homeless men who froze to death. One was in Madrid, the other in Calatayud. On 9 January, another 8 in (20 cm) of snow fell in Madrid. The system began to get very disorganized on January 12, and was absorbed by a system named Dimitrios (see below), by the 13th.

=== Storm Christoph ===
Storm Christoph
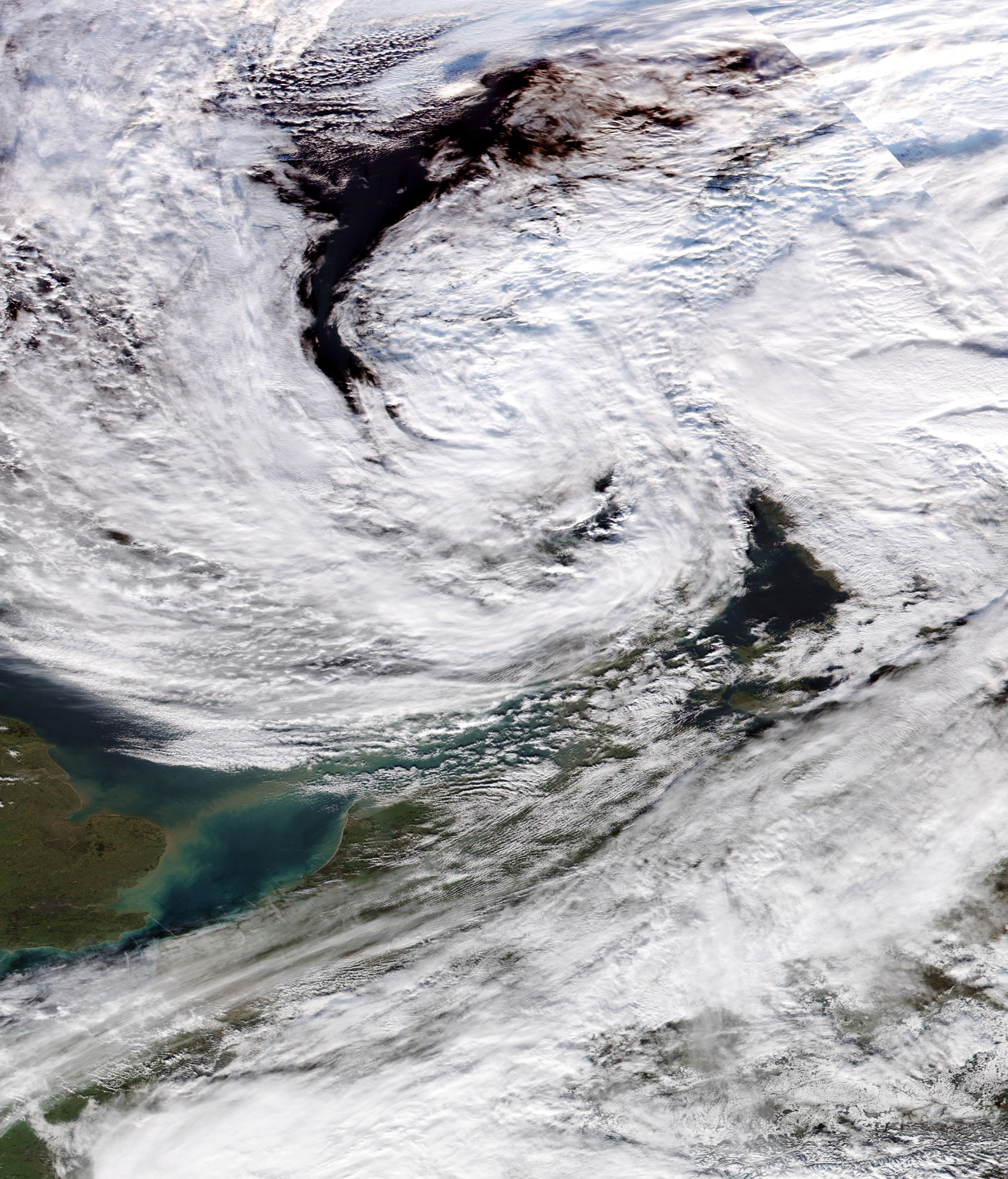
- Area affected: United Kingdom, Republic of Ireland, Scandinavia
- Date of impact: 18–26 January 2021
- Maximum wind gust: 169 km/h (105 mph) Sandnessjøen, Norway
- Lowest pressure: 948 hPa (28.0 inHg)
- Fatalities: Unspecified
- Power outages: Unspecified
- Damage: Undetermined

Storm Christoph was named on 18 January by the Met Office. It brought heavy flooding to homes in the United Kingdom and a snowstorm in Northern England. After moving away from the United Kingdom, it hit Scandinavia with strong winds and snow. Norway's meteorological service gave the storm the name "Frank". Northern Norway was hit by strong winds up to 50 m/s, and combined with low temperatures (−15 °C) the meteorological service warned for high risks of frostbite if staying outdoors. Heavy snowfall hit northern Sweden, some places bringing up to 1 meter of snow. Trains were halted in the regions of Jämtland and Norrbotten, and traffic was disrupted in all of Norrland as well as parts of eastern Norway. Snow and winds cut power to several thousand people in eastern Norway and disrupted the mobile network. The storm stalled over the Norwegian Sea for about 4 days, then dissipated by January 26.

=== Storm Gaetan ===
Storm Gaetan
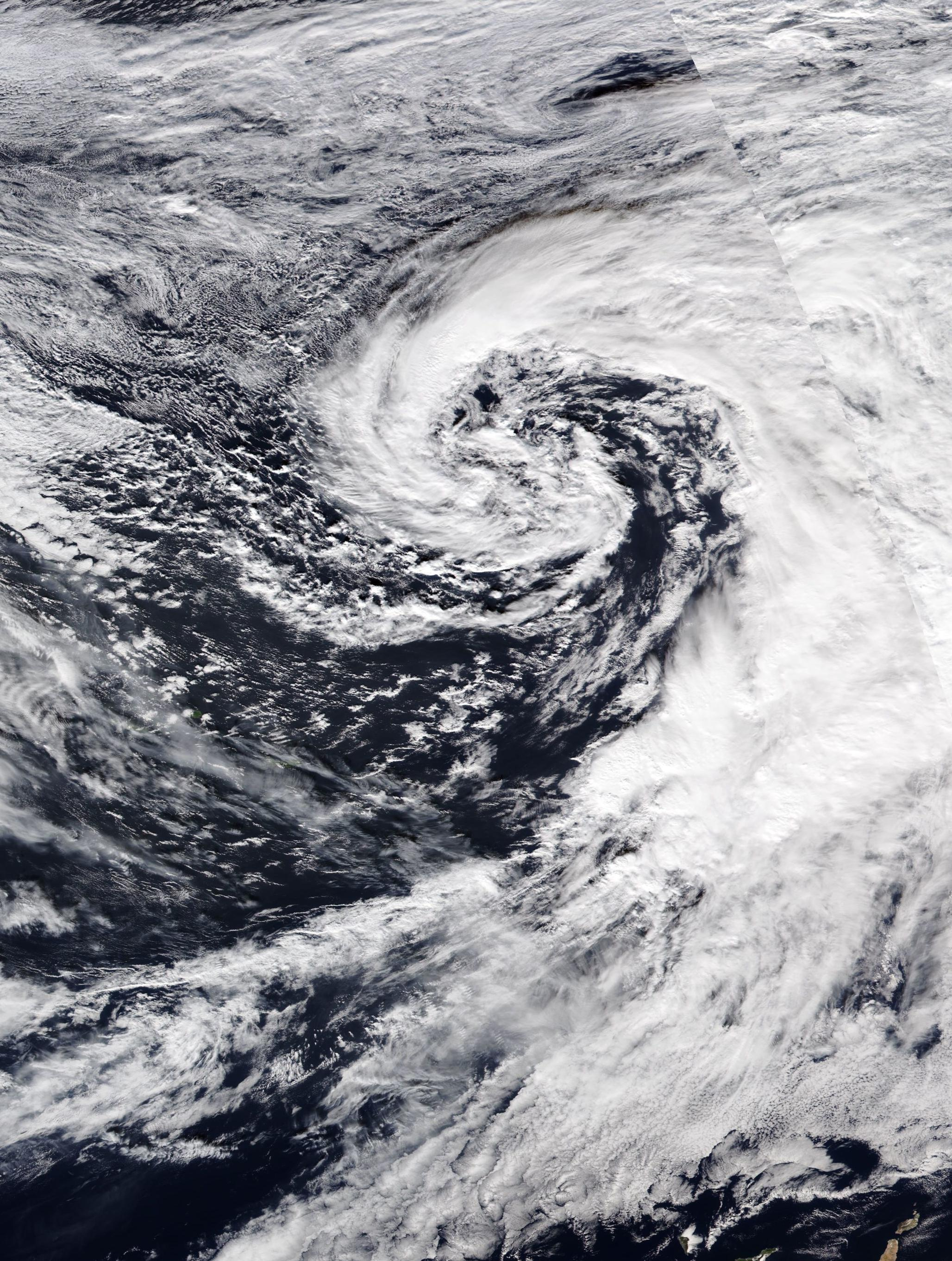
- Area affected: Spain, United Kingdom, Germany
- Date of impact: 19 – 20 January 2021
- Fatalities: Unspecified
- Power outages: Unspecified
- Damage: Undetermined

Storm Gaetan was named on 19 January. It followed a similar path to the one Christoph took. It hit Spain and the United Kingdom with strong winds, rain, and some snow. It was absorbed into Storm Christoph on 20 January.

=== Storm Hortense ===
Storm Hortense
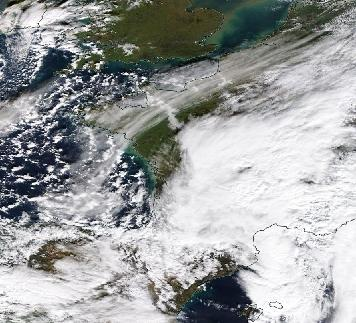
- Area affected: Spain, Portugal, France, Germany, Finland
- Date of impact: 20 – 25 January 2021
- Lowest pressure: Unspecified
- Fatalities: Unspecified
- Power outages: Unspecified
- Damage: Undetermined

Storm Hortense was named by AEMET on 20 January. It hit the Iberian Peninsula on 21 and 22 January, bringing wind gusts of up to 144 km/h (89 mph), though there were some unofficial reports of 170 km/h (110 mph). The system then affected Finland, and dissipated by January 25.

=== Storm Ignacio ===
Storm Ignacio
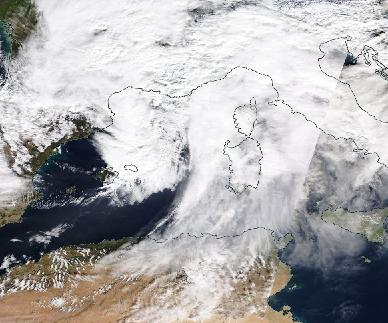
- Area affected: Spain, Portugal, France, Italy
- Date of impact: 22 – 26 January 2021
- Lowest pressure: Unspecified
- Fatalities: Unspecified
- Power outages: Unspecified
- Damage: Undetermined

Storm Ignacio was named on 22 January by AEMET and was active until the 26th. The storm moved over Spain and Italy with heavy rain. After that, the storm moved into East-Central Europe, bringing up to 12 in (30 cm) of snow in some areas.

=== Storm Justine ===
Justine was named on 26 January by IPMA. It caused rain and strong winds for Spain and France. Parts of Ireland and Southern England also recorded snowfall totals of up to 5 in (13 cm). There were wind gusts as high as 85 mph (137 km/h) along the coasts of Northern Spain and Southwestern France. It was absorbed by another system that brought significant snow to areas of Croatia and Slovenia.

=== Storm Darcy ===
Storm Darcy
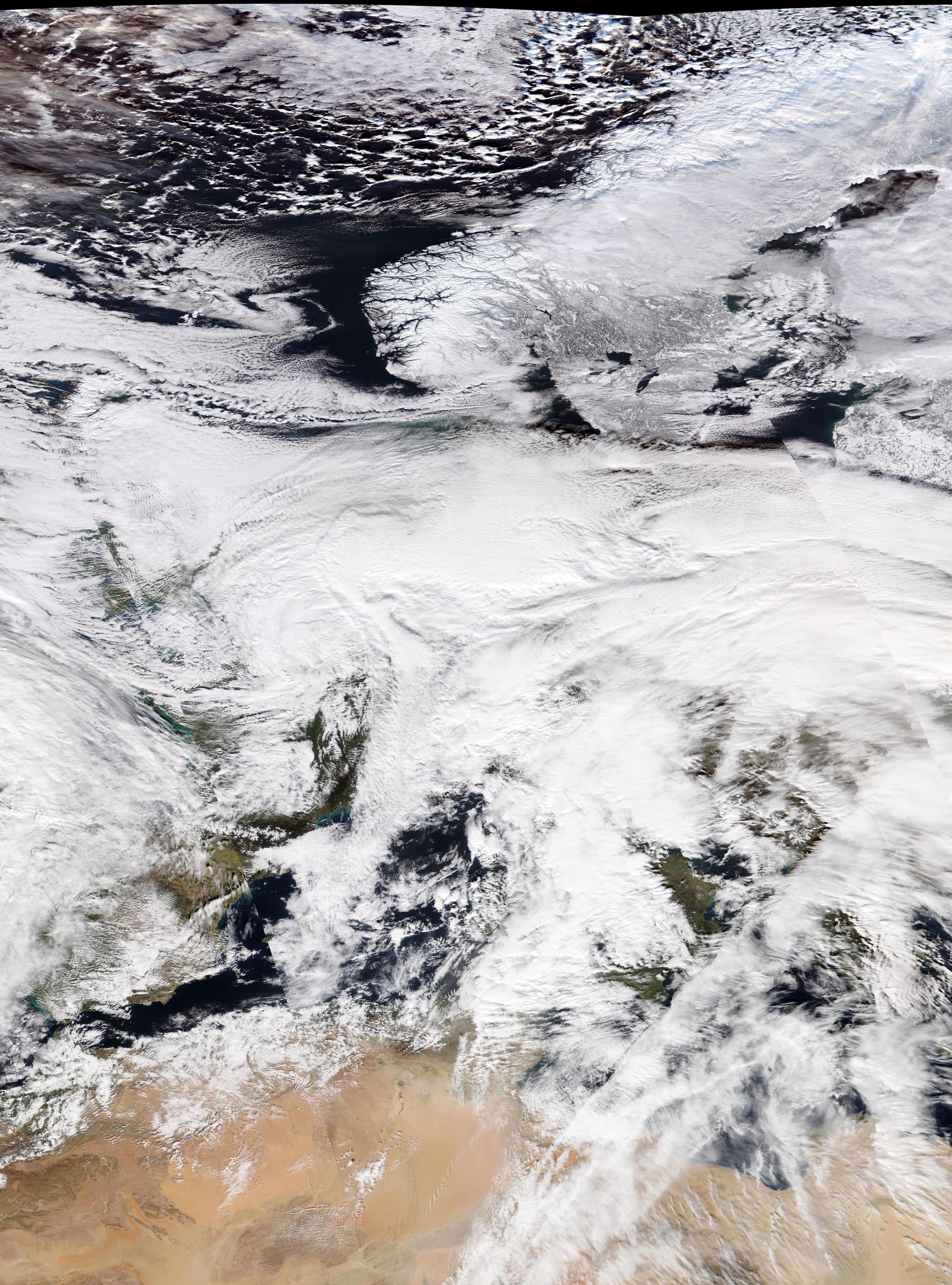
- Area affected: Germany, the Netherlands, Belgium, United Kingdom, Ireland
- Date of impact: 6 – 8 February 2021
- Fatalities: Unspecified
- Power outages: Unspecified
- Damage: Undetermined

Storm Darcy was named on 5 February and brought high winds and heavy snowfall to Ireland, Germany, Netherlands and the United Kingdom on 7–8 February. In the Netherlands and Germany, it resulted in the heaviest snowfall in a long while. The Netherlands announced a red weather alarm for 7 February for the whole country for the first time since 2012. Locally in North Rhine-Westphalia, and in the Dutch Twente and Achterhoek regions and Arnhem–Nijmegen metropolitan area, the snow reached as tall as 30 cm (12 in). Public transport schedules in the Netherlands were very disrupted. From the afternoon of 7 February and in the morning of 8 February, train traffic was completely stopped due to frozen switches. On 8 February, national Dutch newspapers including De Telegraaf, De Volkskrant and Algemeen Dagblad did not print any physical copies due to the bad weather. The forecast prevalence of cold temperatures at night (down to −20 °C) led to increasing hopes for the first Elfstedentocht (long-distance ice skating event) since 1997, although the event was cancelled in November 2020 due to the pandemic.

=== Storm Karim ===
Karim was named on 17 February. Orange warnings for wind were issued for parts of the northwest corner of Spain, alerting residents of wind gusts of up to 109 km/h (68 mph). The system also affected most of Ireland and Scotland, bringing rain and moderate wind.

=== Storm Evert ===
Storm Evert
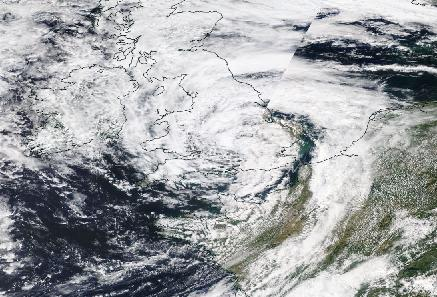
- Date of impact: 29 July – 2 August 2021

Evert named by the Met Office on 29 July was a late season storm which brought strong winds and heavy rain to parts of the United Kingdom. Amber wind warnings were issued for much of the Cornwall as well as the Isles of Scilly with yellow wind warnings having been issued for much of the south-west and south coast of England, as well as Southern Wales.

== Other systems ==
A powerful cyclone, named Aila by the Finnish Meteorological Institute, struck Finland, on 16 September and continued to cause disruption through the following day. The worst impacts were felt in south-central Finland, just north of Helsinki. In these areas, the storm brought heavy rain and wind. There were waves up to 5.8 m (19 ft) in height and winds up to 124 km/h (77 mph; 67 kn). The most rain fell in Kajaani, where they got as much rain as they get in all of September from Aila. In terms of physical impacts, the storm disrupted ferry traffic, brought down trees, and cut power to at least 90,000 homes.

Cyclone Ianos, a medicane named by the METEO unit of the National Observatory of Athens moved through Greece between 17 and 18 September. It resulted in the death of at least 3 people and train services connecting the north and south of Greece being cut off. The storm came with significant flooding and winds near or above hurricane-force.

On 2 November the remains of Hurricane Zeta hit Finland. It was not given a name by the Finnish Meteorological Institute, but was commonly referred to as Topi, especially by the Swedish-language media in the country. It brought winds up to 129 km/h (80 mph; 69.6 kn; 35.8 m/s), cutting power to more than 16,000 people and disrupting the railway lines. The storm also brought high coastal waters, the water levels rising as much as 90 cm (35 in) in Jakobstad (Finnish: Pietarsaari).

On 19 November, the extratropical remnants of Hurricane Eta hit Finland and were named Liisa (Lisa in Swedish) by the Finnish Meteorological Institute. It brought wind of up to 89 km/h (55 mph; 48 kn), cutting power to more than 64,000 people. Trees and buildings were damaged too. Heavy rain also induced travel difficulties, with slippery roads causing poor driving conditions, as well as damage to rail tracks forcing train services to be delayed or cancelled throughout the country.

Storm Dimitrios, named by the Free University of Berlin, affected Northern Europe on from 10 to 12 January. Its most notable effects were ln Sweden, where the SMHI issued a Red Warning for snow in parts of Västernorrland County, which was the first time they had done so since 2010. The storm caused blizzard conditions in that area, with wind gusts of 64 km/h (40 mph; 35 kn) at times and 46–61 cm (18–24 in) of snowfall in some areas west of the city of Örnsköldsvik. The storm left 6,000 customers in Northern Sweden without power. Strong winds and rain were also present in Finland and Germany.

Storm Klaus, a small but slightly dangerous storm, was named by the FUB on 8 March. The storm brought showers, heavy rain and isolated wind gusts of up to 160 km/h (99 mph; 86 kn). The system primarily affected Germany and Norway.

On 4 May, a late-season storm named Eugen by the Free University of Berlin affected Northern France and Belgium, bringing gusts up to 130 km/h. In Boulogne-sur-Mer, it equalized the windspeed record for May with 133 km/h.

On July 14, a system named Bernd caused the 2021 European floods in Germany, Belgium, and the Netherlands.

== Season effects ==
Storm	Dates active	Highest wind gust	Lowest pressure	Fatalities (+missing)	Damage	Affected areas
Alex	30 September–3 October 2020	186 km/h (116 mph; 100 kn)	969 mbar (28.6 inHg)	16 (1 missing)	Unknown	United Kingdom, Spain, France, Italy
Barbara	20–22 October 2020	216 km/h (134 mph; 117 kn)	990 mbar (29 inHg)	1	Unknown	United Kingdom, Spain, Portugal
Aiden	31 October–2 November 2020	130 km/h (81 mph; 70 kn)	974 mbar (28.8 inHg)	0	Unknown	United Kingdom, Republic of Ireland
Clement	27 November–2 December 2020		993 mbar (29.3 inHg)	0	Unknown	Azores Islands, Canary Islands, Madeira Islands, Iberian Peninsula
Dora	3–5 December 2020					United Kingdom, France, Iberian Peninsula, Southern Scandinavia
Ernest	7– 12 December 2020					Spain, France, Switzerland, Italy, Balkans, Russia, Belarus, Baltics
Bella	25–31 December 2020	171 km/h (106 mph; 92 kn)	956 mbar (28.2 inHg)			United Kingdom, Republic of Ireland, France, Scandinavia, Iceland, Netherlands
Filomena	5–13 January 2021	121 km/h (75 mph; 65 kn)		4	Unknown	Iberian Peninsula, Morocco, Italy, Croatia
Christoph	18–26 January 2021	169 km/h (105 mph; 91 kn)	948 mbar (28.0 inHg)			United Kingdom, Republic of Ireland, Scandinavia
Darcy	6–8 February 2021	80 km/h (50 mph; 43 kn)		Unknown	Unknown	United Kingdom, the Netherlands, Ireland, Germany

== Coordination of storms named by European meteorological services ==
2020–21 named storms table (dates of impact and/or when warnings are issued for, not cyclone duration)
Aila (Fi), Timona (FUB), 16 – 17 September 2020.
Ianos (Gr), Tulpar (Tr), Udine (FUB), 14 – 20 September 2020
Alex (Fr), Brigitte (FUB), 1 – 2 October 2020.
Barbara (Es), Jadranka (FUB), 20 – 22 October 2020.
Aiden (Ie), Nina (FUB), 31 October – 2 November 2020.
Topi (Fi), ex-Zeta (NHC), 2 November 2020.
Liisa (Fi), ex-Eta (NHC), 19 November 2020.
Clement (Es), Invest 90L (NHC), 27 November 2020 – 2 December 2020
Dora (Es), Wenke (FUB), 3 – 5 December 2020
Ernest (Es), Yvonne (FUB), 7 – 12 December 2020
Bella (UK), Hermine (FUB), 25 – 31 December 2020
Filomena (Es), Bartosz (FUB), 5 – 13 January 2021
Dimitrios (FUB), 10–14 January 2021
Christoph (UK), Goran (FUB), Frank (No), 18 – 26 January 2021
Gaetan (Pt), Hakim (FUB) 19 – 20 January 2021
Hortense (Es), Irek (FUB), 20 – 25 January 2021
Ignacio (Es), Lars (FUB), 22 – 26 January 2021
Justine (Pt), Peter (FUB), 26 – 30 January 2021
Darcy (Nl), Tristan (FUB), 3 February 2021
Karim (Es), Christopher (FUB), 19 – 22 February 2021
Lola (Pt), 21 April 2021
Vieno (Fi), Robert (FUB), 15 June 2021
Evert (UK), Ferdinand (FUB), 29 July 2021

== See also ==
- Weather of 2021
- Cyclone Ianos – a Mediterranean tropical-like cyclone in September 2020.
- Subtropical Storm Alpha – a subtropical cyclone in the eastern North Atlantic that made landfall in Portugal in September 2020.
- 2020–2021 North American winter
- List of historical European windstorm names
