= Texel Group =

Coordinates: 46°44′N 11°04′E

The Texel Group (German: Texelgruppe; Italian: Gruppo Tessa, Gruppo di Tessa or Giogaia di Tessa) is a group of mountains of the Ötztal Alps in the Eastern Rhaetian Alps. It is located in South Tyrol in Italy.

The mountain range is part of the Texelgruppe Nature Park and is crossed by the Meraner Höhenweg (Italian: Alta via meranese), a high level footpath.

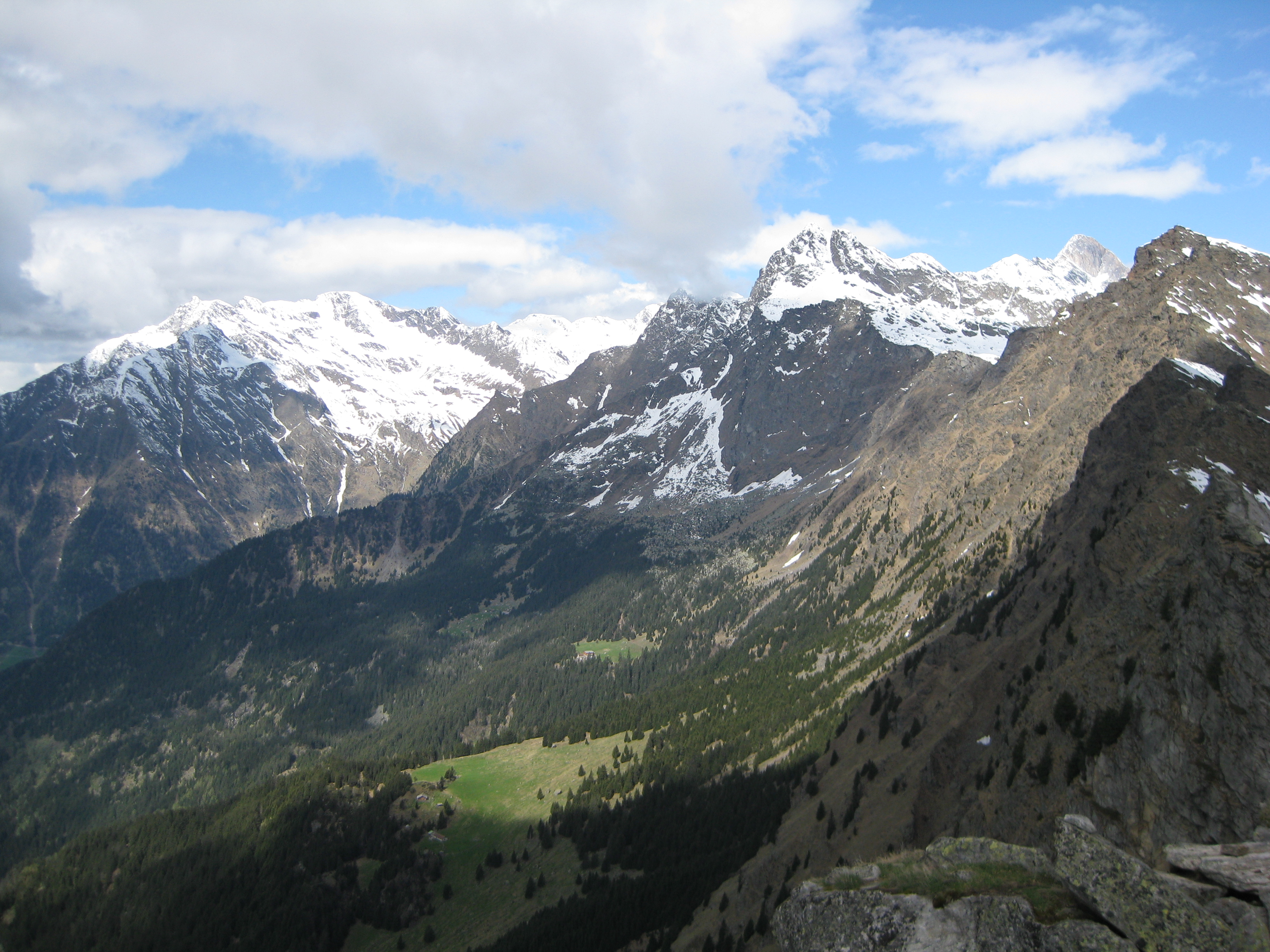
Peaks of the southern Texel Group

== Location ==
The Texel Group is located south of the border between the Austrian Tyrol and South Tyrol, where above the mountain hut Stettiner Hütte, at the Eisjöchl, the Schnalskamm joins the Ötztal Alps.

== Boundaries ==
The group is bounded to the south by the Vinschgau with the Adige valley, to the east by the Passeier Valley, and to the west by the Schnalstal. The northern boundary that separates the group from the Schnalskamm is the Pfossental west of the Eisjöchl. To the north-west the Pfelderer Tal separates the Texel Group from the Gurglkam.

== Mountains ==
The highest peak of the group is the Roteck 3337 m (10,948 ft): other important peaks are the Texelspitze, 3318 m, the Hohe Weiße, 3281 m, the Trübwand, 3264 m, the Tschigat, 3000 m, or Spronser Rötelspitze, 2625 m. The mountain range is located entirely within the Texelgruppe Nature Park.

=== List of peaks ===
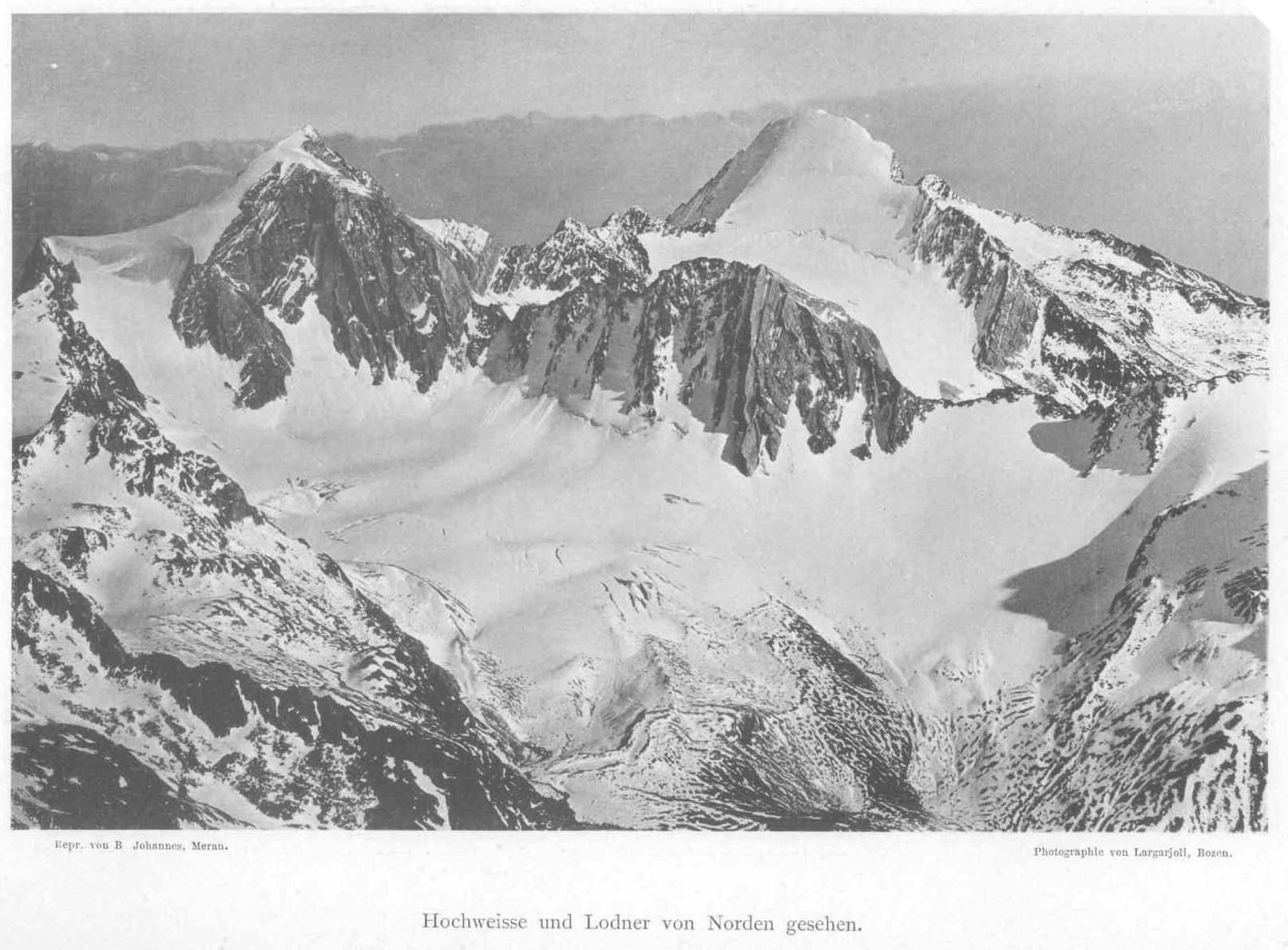
Hohe Weiße) (left) and Lodner (right) seen from north on a picture postcard of 1891.

In descending order of height:

- Roteck, 3337 m
- Texelspitze, 3318 m
- Hohe Weiße, 3281 m
- Trübwand, 3264 m
- Nördlicher Roter Kamp, 3258 m
- Südliche Rote Wand, 3254 m
- Südlicher Roter Kamp, 3250 m
- Lodner, 3219 m
- Nördliche Rote Wand, 3184 m
- Gfallwand, 3175 m
- Blaulackenspitze, 3173 m
- Schwarzwand, 3170 m
- Auf dem Kreuz, 3163 m
- Grafspitze, 3147 m
- Gingglspitze, 3140 m
- Hochkarjochspitze, 3098 m
- Kirchbachspitze, 3081 m
- Schwarze Wand, 3065 m
- Kleine Weiße, 3059 m
- Lazinser Rötelspitze, 3037 m
- Schrottner, 3023 m
- Zielspitze, 3006 m
- Schnalsberg, 3001 m
- Tschigat, 3000 m
- Kleiner Schrottner, 2998 m
- Rötenspitze, 2875 m
- Kolbenspitze, 2868 m
- Sefiarspitze, 2846
- Blasiuszeiger, 2837 m
- Plattenspitze, 2828 m
- Schieferspitze, 2813 m
- Schwarzkopf, 2804
- Ehrenspitze, 2756
- Ulsenspitze, 2736
- Schwarzkogel, 2668 m
- Spronser Rötelspitze, 2625 m
- Mulsspitze, 2621 m
- Moosbichl, 2541 m
- Spitzhorn, 2528 m
- Hochwart, 2452 m
- Sattelspitze, 2426
- Hütterberg, 2407 m
- Hohe Wand, 2358 m
- Mutspitze, 2295 m
- Muthspitze, 2264
- Platterberg, 2230 m
- Matatzspitze, 2179 m

== Climate ==
Given the altitude, the climate of this mountain system is very cold, typical of high mountains. Windstorms are frequent, and in winter often accompanied by temperatures several degrees below zero and heavy snowfalls that can reduce visibility to zero. In summer there are frequent violent thunderstorms, also with hail. Changes in weather are frequent and unpredictable and this can make excursions somewhat dangerous.
