= Weißkamm =

The heavily glaciated Weißkamm is an Alpine chain that includes the Weißkugel (3,739 m (AA)) and Wildspitze (3,772 m above sea level (AA)), the two highest peaks in the Ötztal Alps. Starting from the Weißkugel the Weißkamm runs for about 20 kilometres to the northwest towards Sölden. Other ridges branch off the Weißkamm striking northwards. From west to east these are the Glockturmkamm, the Kaunergrat and the Geigenkamm. The Weißkugel is where the Weißkamm joins the Schnalskamm, which runs in an easterly direction.

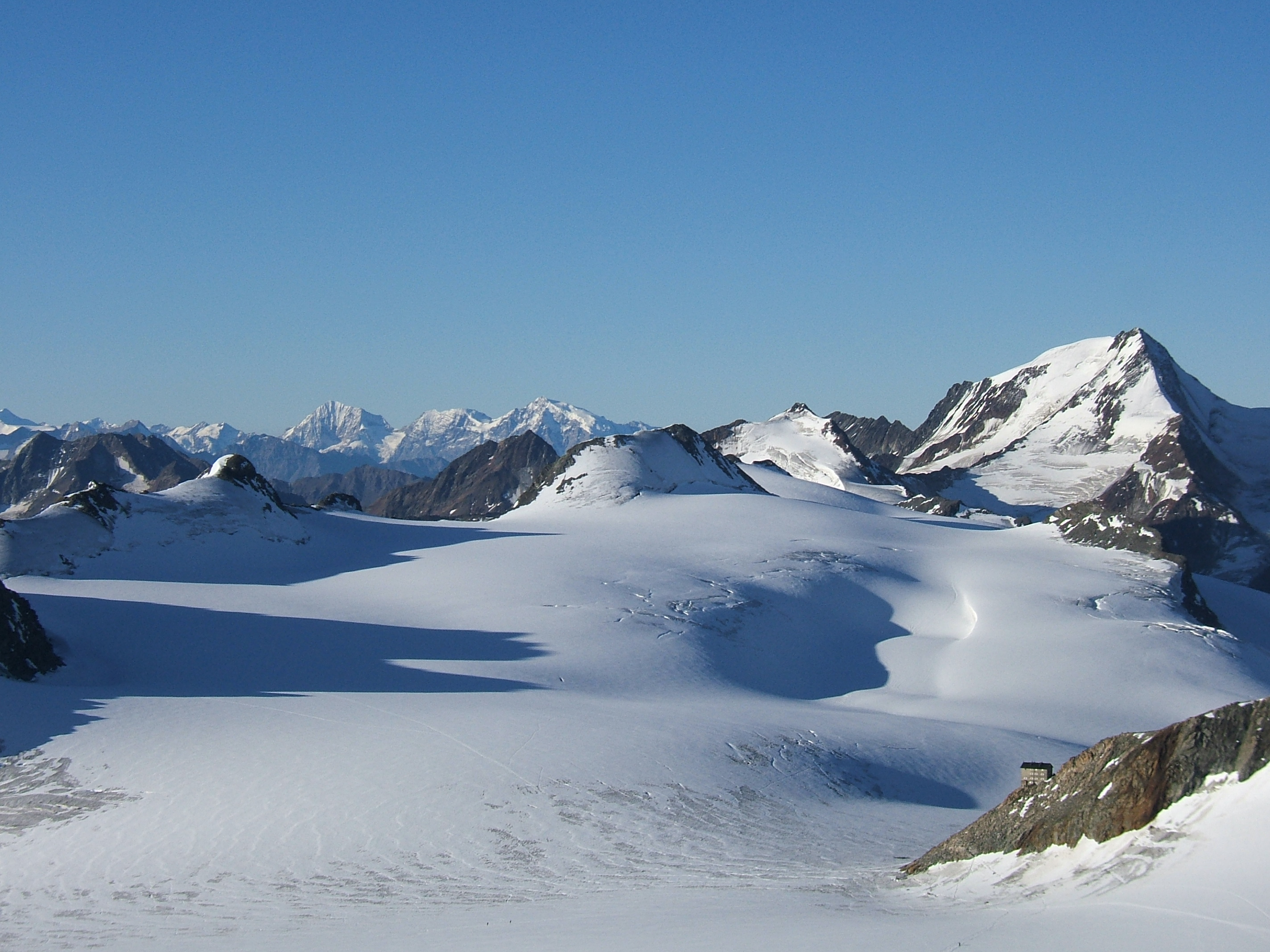
The Gepatschferner glacier and the Weißkugel. Foreground: the Brandenburger Haus

The Gepatschferner and the Mittelbergferner are the two largest glaciers in the Ötztal Alps; both are situated in the area of the Weißkamm. Together with the Kesselwandferner, Vernagtferner and Taschachferner they form an almost unbroken ice sheet.

Apart from the Weißkugel and the Wildspitze, other important summits on the Weißkamm are the Fluchtkogel (3,497 m above sea level (AA)), the Hochvernagtspitze (3,539 m above sea level (AA)), the Hinterer Brunnenkogel (3,440 m above sea level (AA)) and the Hinterer Brochkogel (3,628 m above sea level (AA))

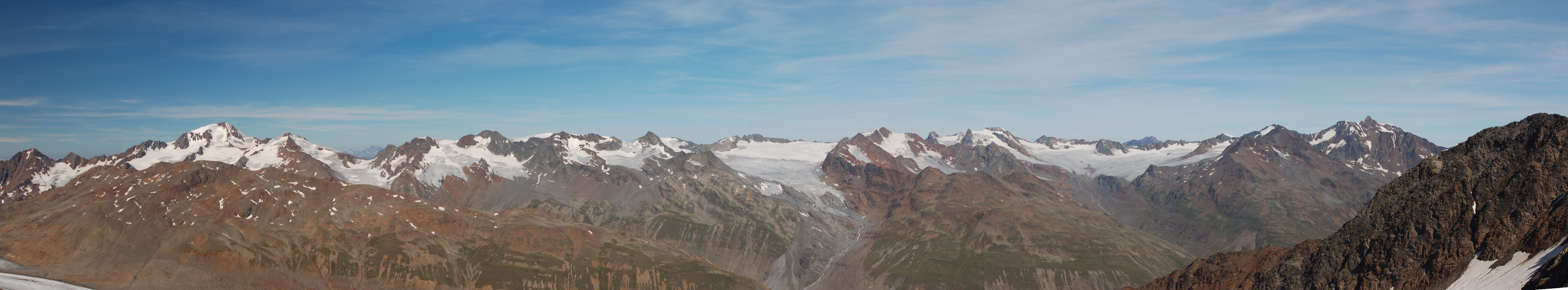
The Weißkamm from the Schwemserspitze to the Wildspitze, seen from the Saykogel

== Summits ==
Summit	Elevation
Wildspitze	3,772 m
Weißkugel	3,739 m
Hinterer Brochkogel	3,635 m
Vorderer Brochkogel	3,565 m
Innerer Bärenbartkogel	3,557 m
Ötztaler Urkund	3,556 m
Hochvernagtspitze	3,539 m
Langtauferer Spitze	3,529 m
Weißseespitze	3,526 m
Innere Quellspitze	3,516 m
Fluchtkogel	3500 m
Hintere Hintereisspitze	3,486 m
Petersenspitze	3,484 m
Schuchtkogel	3,472 m
Schwarzwandspitze	3,467 m
Mittlere Hintereisspitze	3,451 m
Hinterer Brunnenkogel	3,440 m
Vordere Hintereisspitze	3,437 m
Hochvernagtwand	3,435 m
Southern Sexegertenspitze	3,429 m
Obere Kesselwände	3,425 m
Kesselwandspitze	3,414 m
Weißer Kogel	3,409 m
Vorderer Brunnenkogel	3,393 m
Innere Schwarze Schneide	3,369 m
Taufkarkogel	3,367 m
Vernagl	3,355 m
Northern Sexegertenspitze	3,350 m
Mitterkopf	3,347 m
Hintergraslspitzen	3,325 m
Mutkogel	3,312 m
Tiefenbachkogel	3,309 m
Rechter Fernerkogel	3,298 m
Linker Fernerkogel	3,278 m
Im Hinteren Eis	3,270 m
Äußere Schwarze Schneide	3,257 m
Mutspitze	3,257 m
Falginer Karlesspitzen	3,231 m
Teufelsegg	3,227 m
Mitterkamm	3,222 m
Pitztaler Urkund	3,201 m
Adlerkopf	3,200 m
Mittagskogel	3,162 m
Hintere Guslarspitze	3,147 m
Wiesjagglskopf	3,130 m
Mittlere Guslarspitze	3,128 m
Vordere Guslarspitze	3,118 m
Karleskogel	3,107 m
Schwarzkögele	3,070 m
Gaislachkogel	3,058 m
Grabkogel	3,052 m
Pitztaler Jochkopf	3,023 m
Wildes Mannle	3,019 m
Rauhe Köpfe	2,990 m
Karleskopf	2,901 m
Steinschlagspitze	2,861 m

== Literature ==
- B. und E. Pinzer: Pitztal Edition Löwenzahn, Innsbruck, 2000, ISBN 3-7066-2204-1
- Walter Klier: Ötztaler Alpen, Alpine Club Guide, Bergverlag Rudolf Rother, Munich, 2006. ISBN 3-7633-1123-8
