= Petersenspitze =

- Location within Austria

Highest point
- Elevation: 3,484 m (11,430 ft)
- Prominence: 60 m (200 ft)
- Parent peak: Hinterer Brochkogel
- Coordinates: 46°53′19″N 10°50′18″E

Geography
- Location: Tyrol, Austria
- Parent range: Ötztal Alps

Climbing
- First ascent: 28 Jul 1874 by Victor Hecht, Johann Pinggera, Josef Spechtenhauser, and Moritz von Dechy
- Easiest route: From the southeast from the Vernagthütte

The Petersenspitze is a peak in the Weisskamm group of the Ötztal Alps best known for its north face. In combination with the north faces of the Taschachwand and the Hinterer Brochkogel it forms the challenging Ötztaler Eisexpress route to the Wildspitze. Petersenspitze is named after Theodor Petersen, who had many first ascents in the Ötztal Alps in between 1871 and 1893, including those of Texelspitze, Roteck, Rofelewand, Hinterer Brunnenkogel, Bliggspitze, Hintereisspitzen, Verpeilspitze, Schwabenkopf, and Rostizkogel.
