= Vernagtferner =

Glacier located in Tyrol

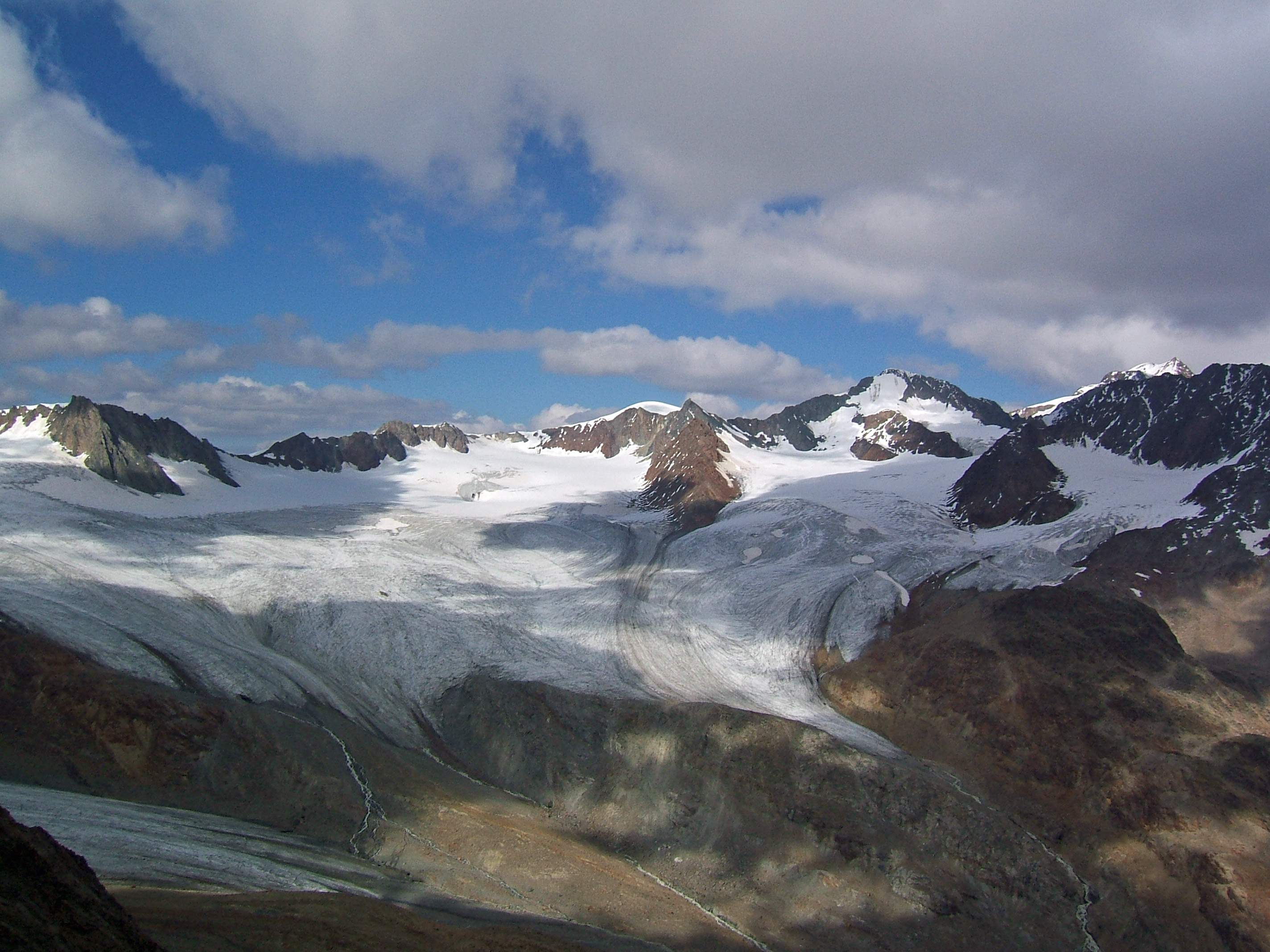
- Vernagtferner from the south (2005), from the Hintergrasleck
- Type: Mountain glacier
- Location: Tyrol, Austria
- Coordinates: 46°52′0″N 10°49′0″E
- Area: 7.31 km^{2} (2.82 sq mi)
- Length: 2.6 km (1.6 mi)

The Vernagtferner is a glacier located in the Ötztal Alps in Tyrol, Austria, which covers an area of 7.31 km², making it one of the largest glaciers in the Eastern Alps. The glacier is situated on the southern side of the Weißkamm. The Hochvernagtspitze and the Brochkogel are the highest mountains within its catchment region. While some maps divide Vernagtferner into Kleiner Vernagtferner and Großer Vernagtferner, with the eastern portion of the Brochkogel area referred to as Kleiner Vernagtferner, these sub-areas do not meet scientific criteria for separate designation.

The Vernagtferner glacier in the Eastern Alps is probably the best-documented glacier in history. This is primarily due to the glacial lake eruptions it has caused, which were greatly feared in the Ötztal region from the 16th to the 19th century. However, the Vernagtferner has moved far away from the Rofental and is significantly impacted by the glacier's retreat.

== Location and shape ==
Located north of the Rofental, an extension of the Venter Valley, the Vernagtferner glacier is situated on the south side of the Weißkamm mountain range, which is part of the Ötztal Alps. The glacier lies just a short distance to the west of Wildspitze, the highest mountain in Tyrol.

The Schwarzwandspitze, Hochvernagtspitze, Petersenspitze, Vorderer, and Hinterer Brochkogel, all peaks of the Weißkamm, surround the Vernagtferner. The Vernagtferner nourishes the Vernagtbach, which eventually flows into the Rofenache after a few kilometers. From there, the glacier's waters make their way through the Venter and Ötztaler Ache, the Inn, the Danube, and finally into the Black Sea.

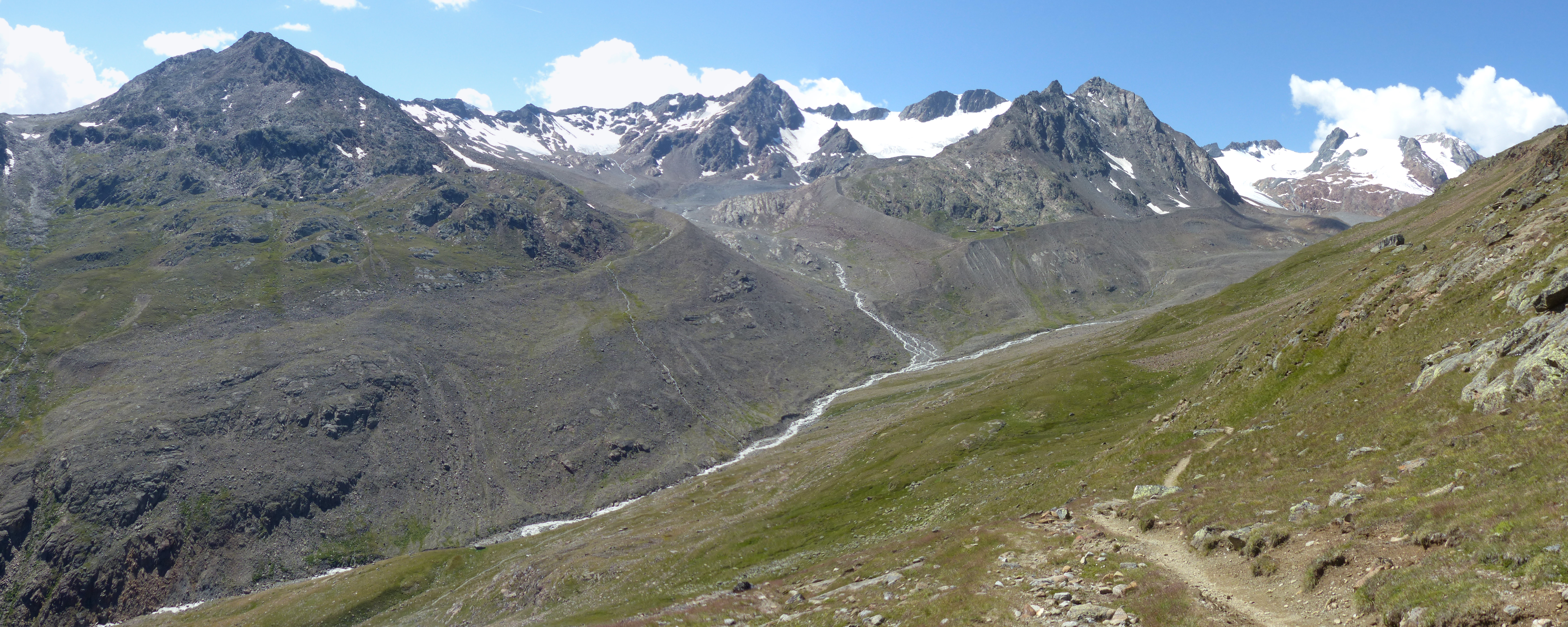
Retreat area of the Vernagtferner below the Vernagthütte

The Vernagtferner glacier, currently extending between altitudes of 3631 and 2793 m, has a shape that clearly differs from that of a typical alpine valley glacier, such as its neighboring Hintereis or Kesselwandferner. Instead, it is characterized by an extensive firn area composed of several large, flat cirque hollows, as well as large-scale, slightly southward sloping troughs in the central area, and a short and broad tongue next to two other smaller tongue ends. This unique combination of features categorizes the Vernagtferner as a compound basin glacier.

Recent research has shown that the Vernagtferner glacier can be divided into three distinct parts, running from west to east: the Schwarzwand, Taschachjoch, and Brochkogel sectors. While some maps label the region surrounding Brochkogel as Kleiner Vernagtferner, Sebastian Finsterwalder's 1889 map identified the region between Schwarzkögele and Platteikogel as Klein-Vernagtferner. This map depicted a small, isolated ice stream that was still fed by the Vernagtferner at the time, but later separated from it completely. The Klein-Vernagtferner became extinct in the 1970s. There is a theory that this isolated ice stream documented by Finsterwalder was misunderstood when later maps were created, which is thought to have led to the current divide. However, contrary to the division documented on most maps, the western area of the glacier, the Schwarzwand area, is clearly separated from the rest of the glacier.

== History ==
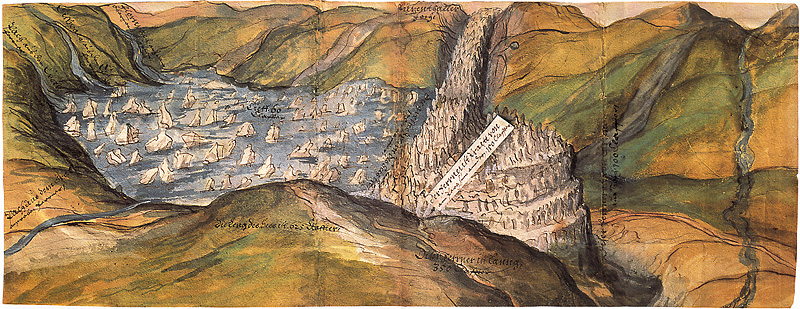
Ink and watercolor drawing "Ice Lake behind Roven" 1601, original in the Tyrolean State Museum, Innsbruck

The Vernagtferner and the nearby Hintereisferner have been among the earliest studied glaciers on Earth, in part because the Rofen Valley could be reached by crossing the then-wildly-torn Vernagtferner. Later, the Vernagtferner dammed up on the opposite rock face, the Zwerchwand, creating an icy dam that blocked the Rofener Ache. This caused the development of the Rofener Eissee, a 1.5 km long reservoir, behind the ice dam. Most of the time, when the snow melted, the water flowed out quietly over the top of the dam. However, sometimes the water made its way under the ice, gradually widening it until the ice dam burst, causing an icy flood wave that devastated the Venter and Ötztal and even flooded the Inn valley in a very short time.

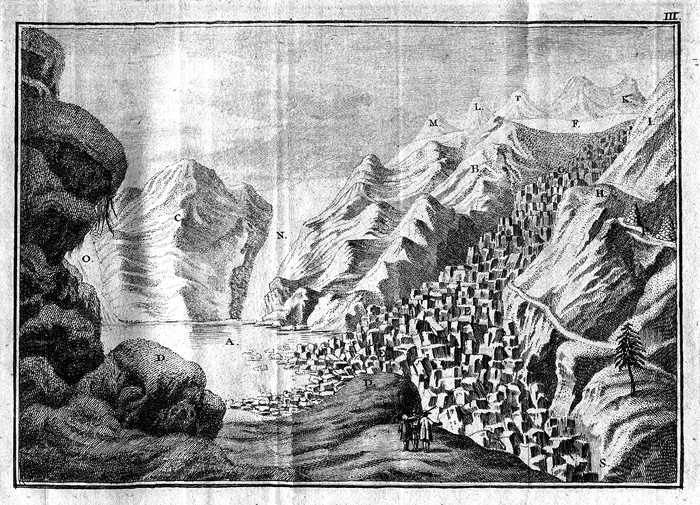
The Rofener Eissee on August 16, 1772, copper engraving, depiction in Joseph Walcher's "Nachrichten von den Eisbergen im Tyrol" from 1773

The illustration portrays the Rofen Ice Lake during modern times and is the earliest-known depiction of an alpine glacier. The lake was formed in July of 1601 during an excursion ordered by Tyrolean authorities to prevent damage to the Ötztal and Inntal regions. The visual accurately depicts the lake's water level at the time, which was 2260 meters. The lake was 1.7 × 0.4 kilometers in length and had a capacity of eleven million cubic meters. Although the graphic portrays the landscape somewhat fancifully, it accurately captures details such as icebergs floating on the lake.

The sudden eruptions of the Eissee mentioned above are well documented, particularly on the basis of the records in the Längenfeld Municipal Chronicle, for the first time for the years 1600–1601 and described by the Innsbruck building scribe Abraham Jäger. Further outbreaks of catastrophic proportions occurred in 1678 and 1680 and also caused crop failures and, thus, numerous victims of starvation. The desperation and powerlessness also led to a bitter witch hunt, to which more people fell victim. There were more outbreaks in 1775, 1778, and 1780 as well as one final series in 1845, 1846, and 1848, the latter of which once more resulted in extremely devastating damage.

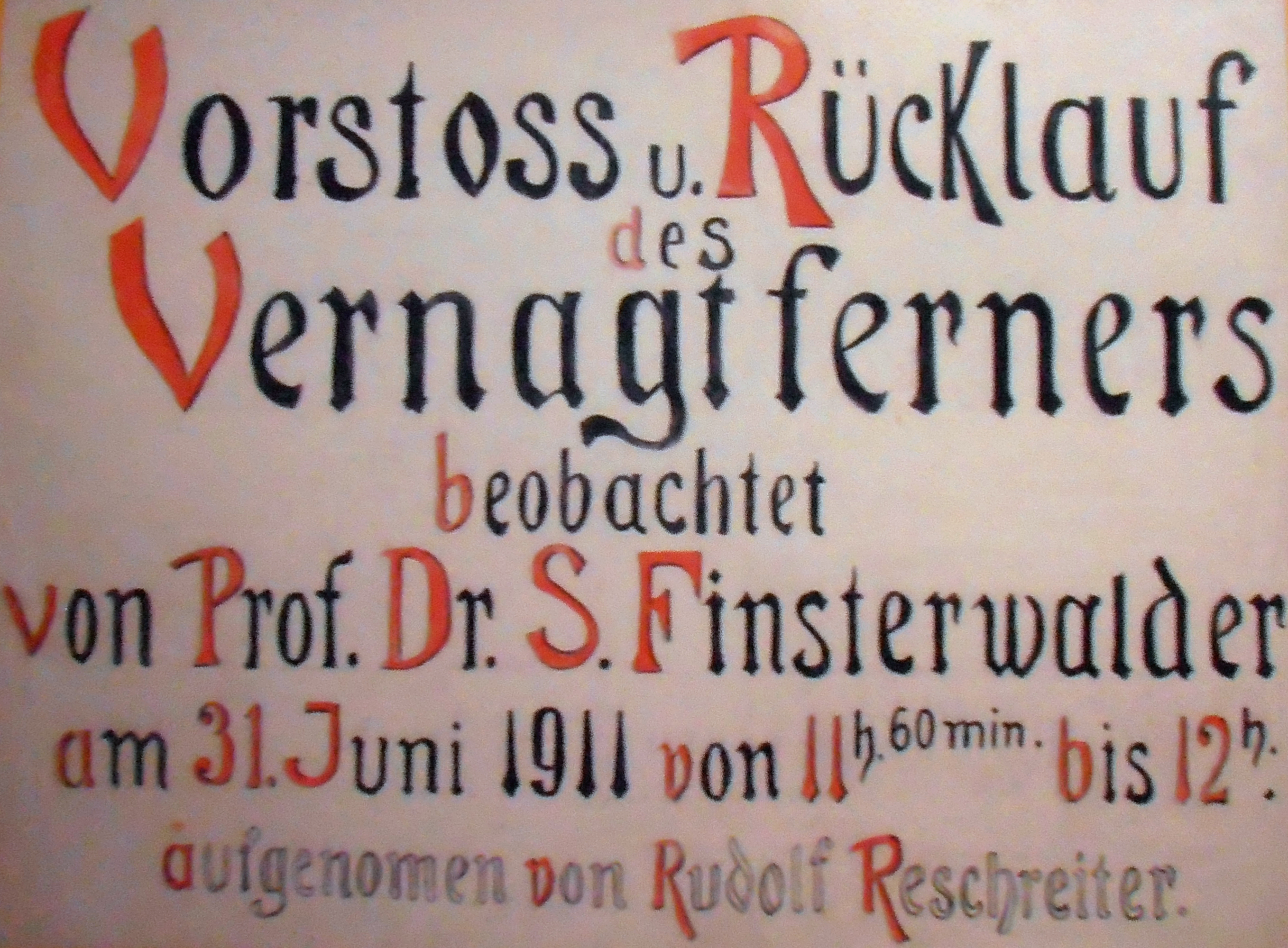
Caricature by Rudolf Reschreiter: advance and retreat of the Vernagtferner, 1911

The glaciers in the Ötztal region received attention early on due to the tragedies they caused, even before scientific research on glaciers began. Joseph Walcher, a Vienna-based mechanical instructor and math professor, visited the Vernagtferner one year after the 1771 eruption and published the earliest scientific study on the Ötztal glaciers in "Nachrichten von den Eisbergen im Tyrol" (1773). In his work, he included instructions on what to do in case of danger, such as clearing the stream and removing timbers from the bank. The Vernagtferner and other Ötztal glaciers were crucial in gaining new insights into glaciology in the following years. Sebastian Finsterwalder, a professor of glacier research at the Technical University in Munich, wrote the standard works on glacier surveying techniques around 1895, which contain ideas about the laws of glacier movement that remain valid today.

Between 1897 and 1902, the Vernagtferner underwent its last significant advance, but during this time, it did not reach the Rofental. Despite this, the glacier's flow rate experienced a dramatic increase, rising from around 20 meters per year to approximately 300 meters per year.

Since 1965, research on the Vernagtferner has been conducted under the auspices of the Commission for Glaciology of the Bavarian Academy of Sciences (KfG of BAdW) in Munich. The establishment of a discharge measuring station on the Vernagtbach and the construction of a gauging station in 1973 greatly expanded research on the Vernagtferner, with particular emphasis on investigating questions related to the water balance in glaciated catchments. This research involves various measurements, including camera recordings, wind speed and direction data, snow and rain accumulations, humidity, temperature, and radiation balances. The studies were conducted by a variety of organizations, including the Technical University of Munich, the Institute for Radiohydrometry of the Society for Radiation and Environmental Research, Institutes of the University of Innsbruck, and the Hydrographic Service of the Province of Tyrol. The German Research Foundation supported this research with the Collaborative Research Centre 81 between 1974 and 1986.

== Current development ==
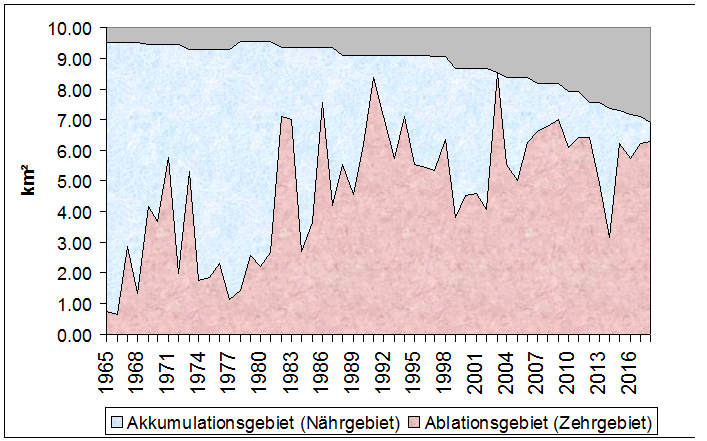
Area (feeding and consumption area) since 1965

The Vernagtferner has receded over time, and today it terminates more than four kilometers away from its previous location, with an elevation of 680 meters above the Rofental. This has eliminated the risk of the glacier forming an ice barrier and blocking the Rofenache. However, the glacier's water output has increased substantially, and it is now more susceptible to significant fluctuations. This can result in dangerous flood waves, as was observed during the summers of 1987 and 1998. The primary reason for this is the loss of the glacier's firn body, which previously had a high storage capacity for meltwater, thereby mitigating outflow over several days or weeks.

The diagrams on the right demonstrate the data collected by the Commission for Glaciology of the BAdW since 1965 on the growth of the Vernagtferner glacier. The upper diagram shows the glacier's area, with the ablation and accumulation areas (nutrient and supply areas) displayed in different colors. The lower graphic presents the overall mass evolution. The Equilibrium Line Altitude (ELA), which marks the altitude where the mass balance of the year is balanced, is also shown to be rising. This line divides the accumulating area and the ablation area.

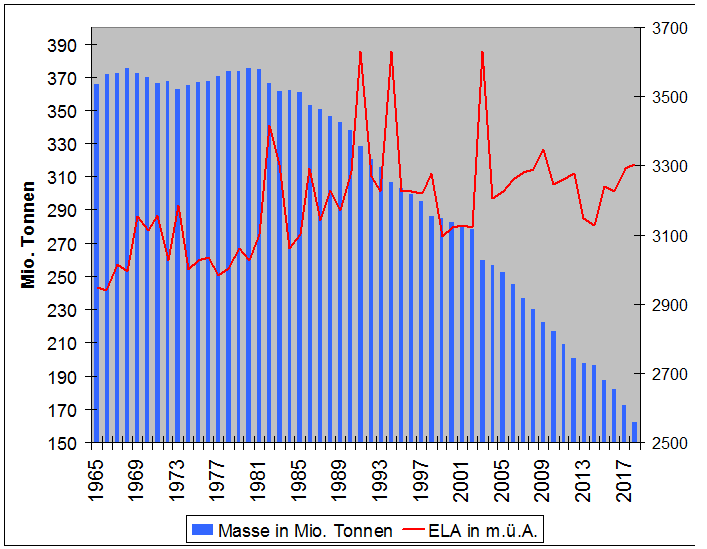
Mass and Equilibrium Line (ELA) since 1965

Glaciologist Oskar Reinwarth reported that the Vernagtferner glacier had a poor growth phase in the mid-1970s before reaching a temporary high in 1980. Since the early 1980s, the glacier has been steadily losing mass, with 1999 being the last summer with a nearly balanced ice budget. Currently, the glacier is losing ice thickness rather than area, which is less noticeable but still significant.

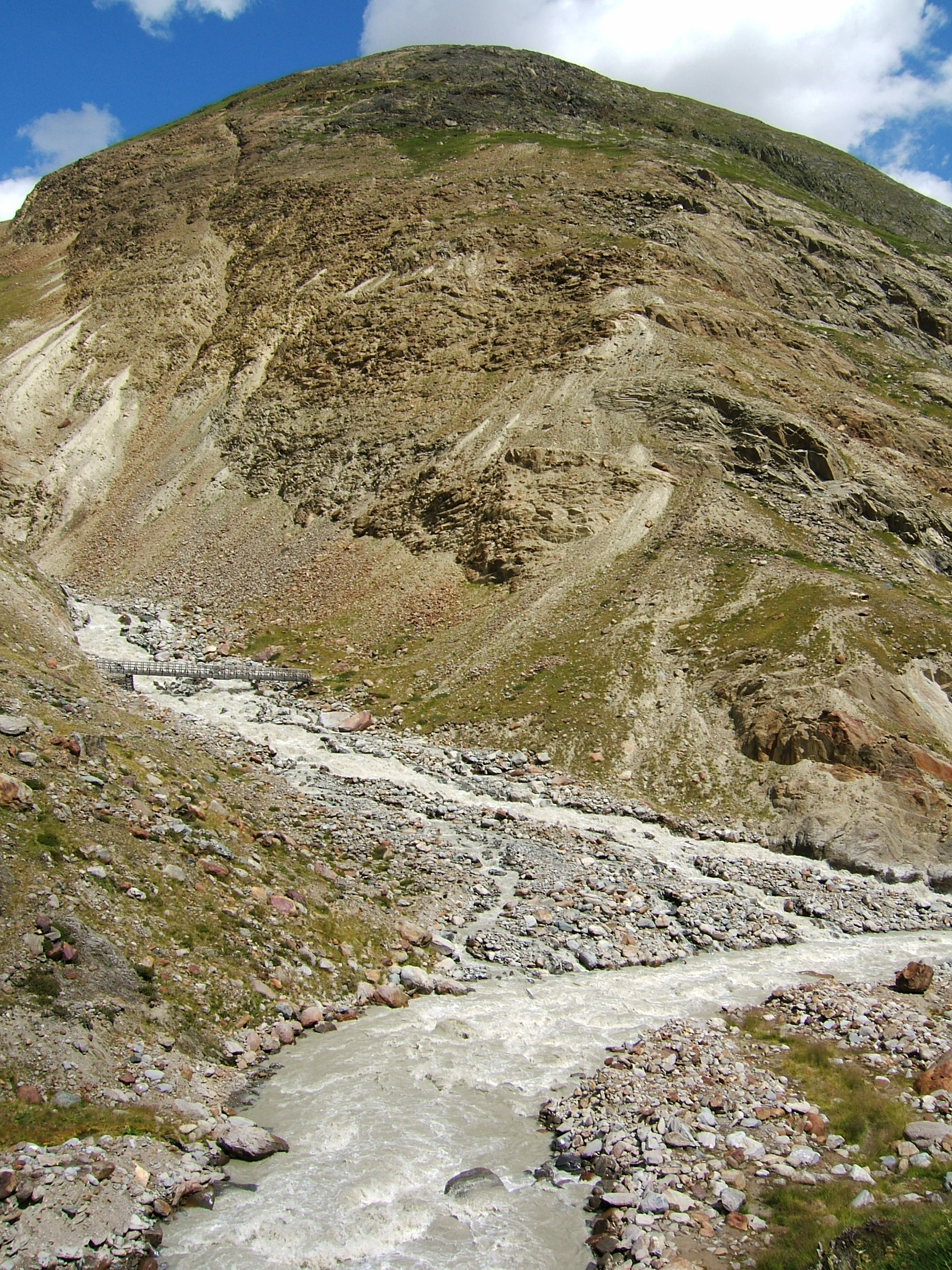
Rofenache (front) and Vernagtbach in July 2007

During the summer of 2003, Vernagtferner experienced an unprecedented loss that had not been seen since scientific exploration began. This was due to several factors, including early ablation that began in winter after a modest snowfall. For the first time in the observation period, the ablation area (Zehrgebiet) extended over the entire glacier surface. The ablation phase, which lasted twice as long as the formerly strongest loss years in the 1990s, was only briefly interrupted by new snowfall. The extreme losses of 2003 continued to have an impact in 2004 and 2005. Despite the weather conditions during the summers of those years, which should have led to a balanced or even slightly positive mass balance, the glacier still experienced losses.

Once again, the summer weather in 2006 caused a significant loss in Vernagtferner's mass balance. Although a new record was not set, this was only due to the cooler and wetter weather in August. By the end of July, the situation was comparable to that of 2003, which had experienced extreme losses.

In the summer of 2007, the Vernagtferner glacier split into two distinct portions. The western portion, known as the Schwarzwand region, became disconnected from the larger eastern portion comprising the Taschachjoch and Brochkogel regions.

== Prognosis ==
According to the findings, Vernagtferner's above-average losses in recent years cannot be attributed solely to environmental changes but are also a result of the glacier's unique characteristics. The main issue is that the glacier has lost most of its firn body, which is crucial for the formation of new glacier ice. Rebuilding the firn body, rekindling the glacier movement, and triggering a new advance would require a prolonged period of cool and wet climate.

The Vernagtferner is expected to retreat slowly towards the high plateau and break up into smaller pieces, ultimately disappearing entirely and leaving behind a barren moraine landscape, if there is no significant change in the climate in the coming decades, this process is expected to be similar to what happened to the Schneeferner at the Zugspitze.

Due to the loss of ice mass stability in the glacier region, the appearance is expected to change as the ice masses have so far supported the rock outline in the ridges and prevented the thawing of the bedrock. This loss of support will likely lead to significant erosion occurrences, as seen in the early 1999 fall of a large rock pillar near Sexenjoch. The Eiger rock fall in the summer of 2006 was also caused by a similar contributing factor.

== Mountaineering ==
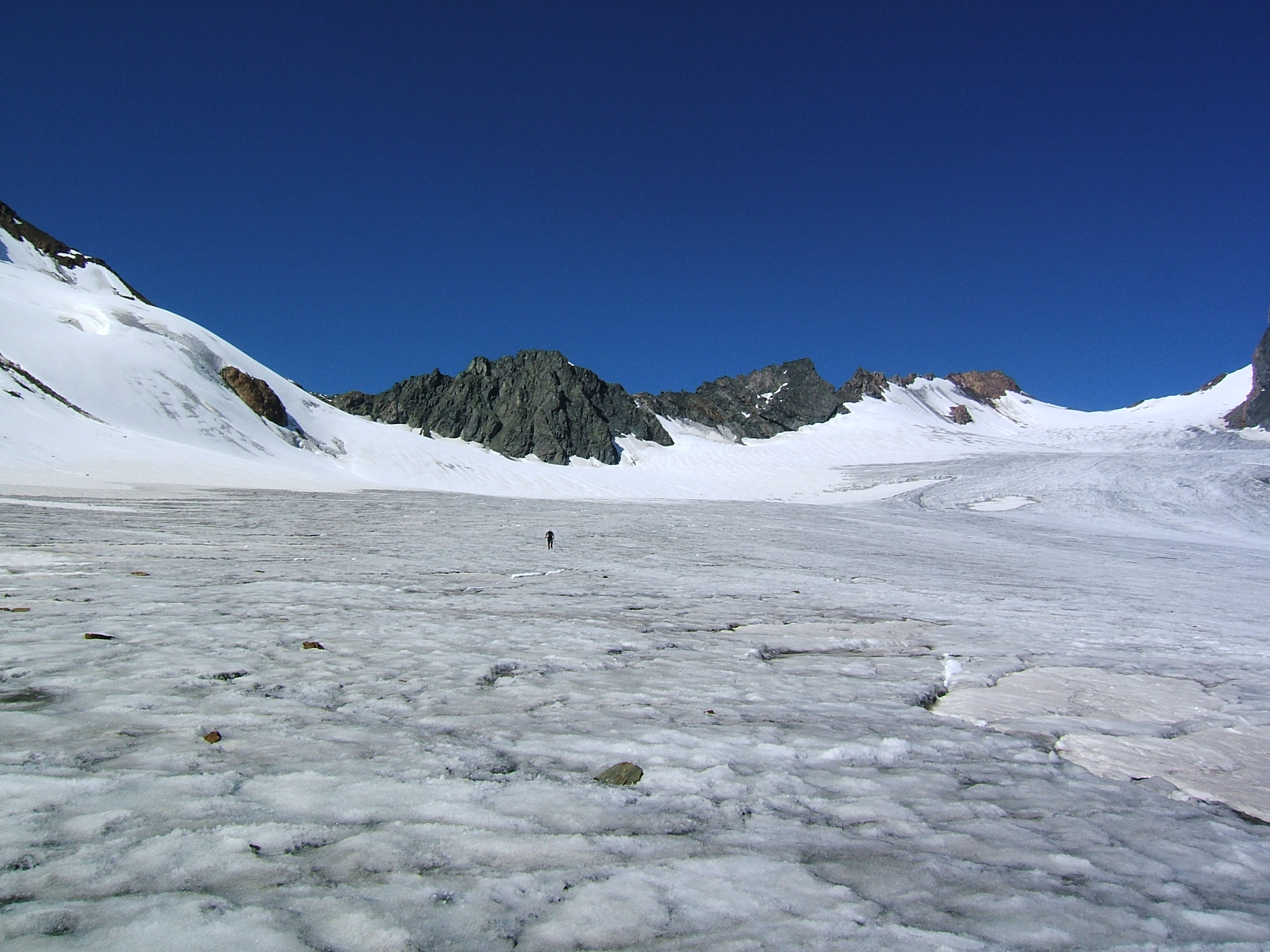
On the way on the aperen (snow-free) part of the Vernagtferner

While the Vernagtferner may not be of significant importance to mountaineering, it is still considered by Richard Goedeke to be "extensive and quite equipped with crevasses." The Vernagthütte typically serves as the starting or ending point for a tour over the glacier. One popular adventure from there is to climb the Wildspitze (3770 m above sea level) via the Brochkogeljoch. Although this route is less commonly taken due to the duration being 4½ hours. There are now significantly shorter ascents to the Wildspitze.

The nearly four-hour trip to the Hochvernagtspitze (3539 m above sea level) and the transition from there to the Taschachhaus through the Taschachjoch and Taschachferner, which involves crossing much of the Vernagtferner, are both noteworthy. However, the glacier is usually fairly isolated during the summer season. The popularity of the ski tour to Hochvernagtspitze results in slightly more traffic on the Vernagtferner during the ski touring season
