= Spronser Lakes =

Lake in South Tyrol, Italy

Coordinates: 46°43′50.20″N 11°5′21.51″E

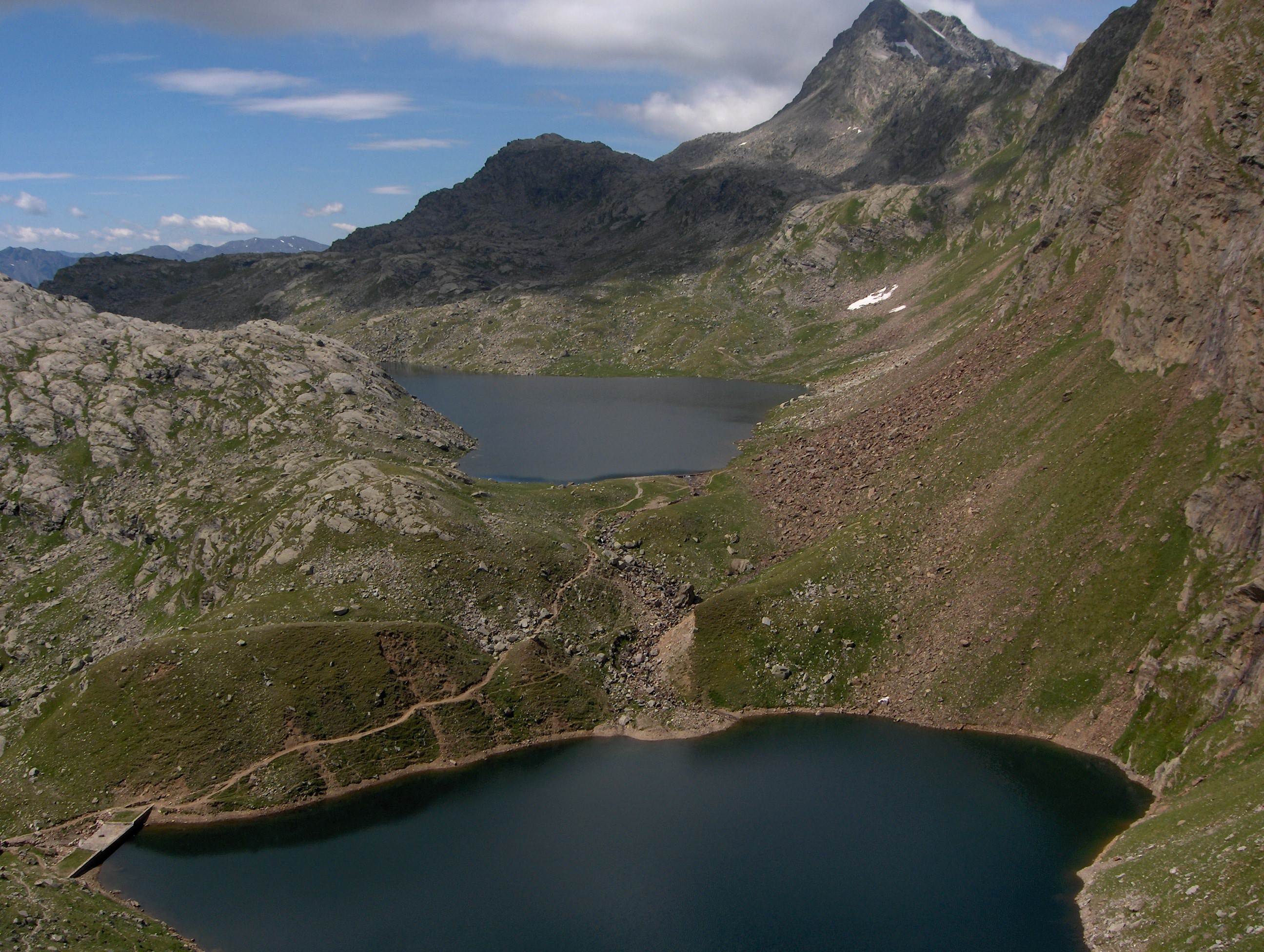
Grünsee and Langsee

The Spronser Lakes (German: Spronser Seenplatte; Italian: Laghi di Sopranes [ˈlaːɡi di soˈpraːnes]) is the largest group of high elevation lakes in the Alps, located in South Tyrol, Italy.

== Lakes ==
The group is located in the eastern part of the Texel Group. Eight to ten lakes of significant size such as the Grünsee (Green Lake), the Langsee (Long Lake), the two Milchseen (Milk Lakes) or the small Mückensee (Midge Lake) occupy a total area of 30 hectares. However, only the Kaser Lacke, the Pfitscher Lacke, the Mückenlacke (Midge Pond), the Grünsee (Green Lake), the Schwarzsee (Black Lake), the Schiefersee (Slate Lake), and the Kesselsee (Kettle Lake) belong officially to this group of lakes. They were eroded by glaciers on a relatively limited area at altitudes from 2117 to 2598 m or left behind in the rocks of the ancient gneises, granite gneisses, and mica schists. The largest body of water is the Langsee (2.377 m) which is alive with salvelinus. A particularly good view can be obtained from the summit of Spronser Rötelspitze (2.625 m). The owner of Auer Castle in the village Tirol has the fishing right in the Langsee.
