= Texel (disambiguation) =

Texel is an island and municipality of the Netherlands.

Texel may also refer to:

- Texel (sheep), a breed of sheep originally from Texel
- Texel (graphics), texture element or texture pixel, the unit of texture space used in computer graphics
- Texel (guinea pig), a variety of guinea pig
- Texel Air, an airline
- Texel Group, a group of mountains in South Tyrol in Italy

== See also ==
- Texel Disaster, the sinking of two British destroyers by German mines off the coast of Texel island on 31 August 1940
- Battle of Texel (disambiguation)
