= Kolbenspitze =

Mountain in Italy

- Location within Italy

Highest point
- Elevation: 2,868 m (9,409 ft)
- Prominence: 361 m (1,184 ft)
- Parent peak: Lodner (Hohe Weisse)
- Coordinates: 46°46′22″N 11°08′52″E

Geography
- Location: South Tyrol, Italy
- Parent range: Ötztal Alps

Climbing
- Easiest route: East ridge via the Ulfas alm

The Kolbenspitze (Italian: La Clava) is a mountain in the Texel group of the Ötztal Alps.
