= Taschachwand =

Mountain in the Ötztal Alps

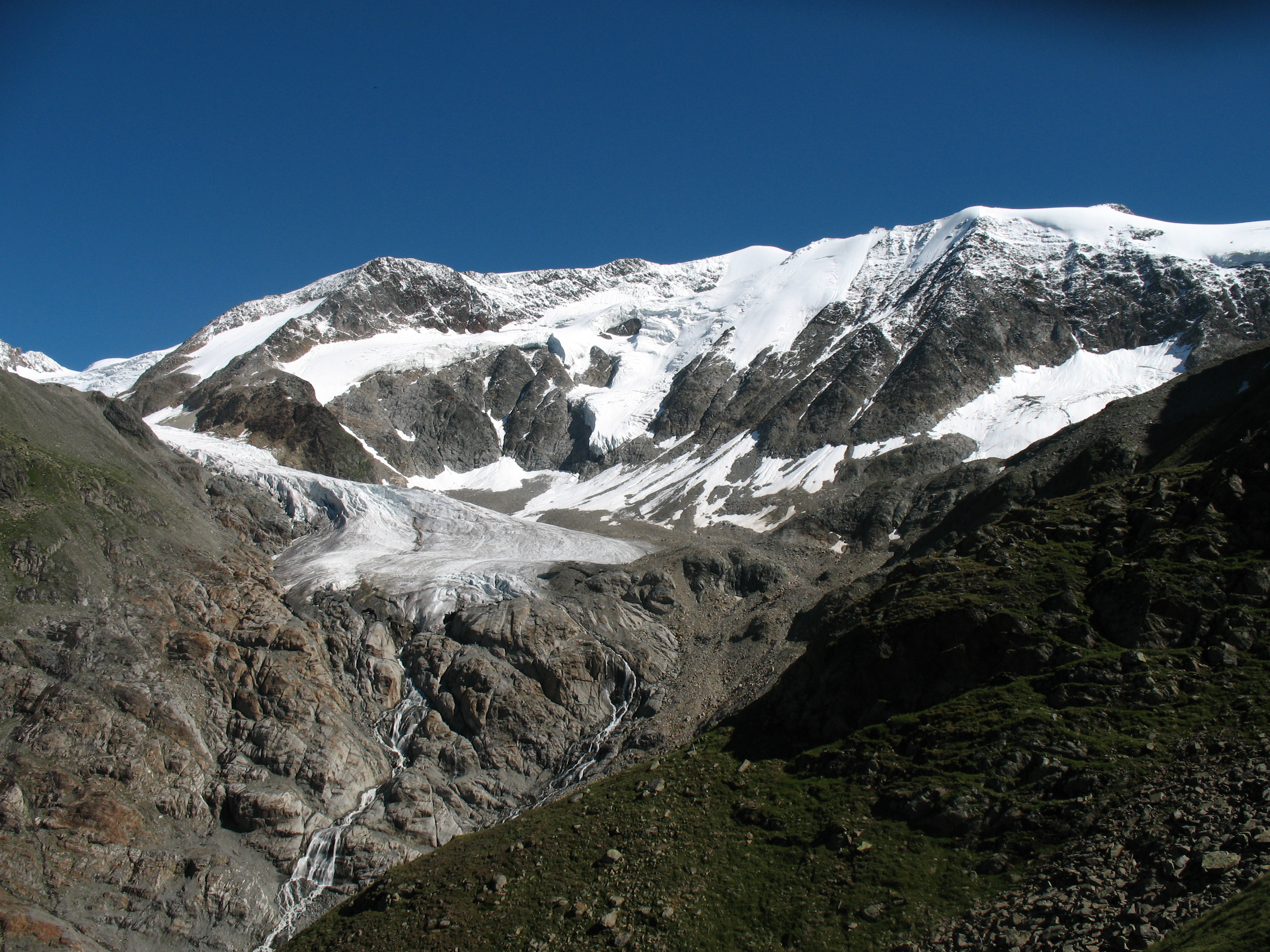

Highest point
- Elevation: 3,365 m (11,040 ft)
- Prominence: 25 m (82 ft)
- Parent peak: Petersenspitze
- Coordinates: 46°53′42″N 10°50′45″E

Geography
- Location within Austria
- Location: Tyrol, Austria
- Parent range: Ötztal Alps

Climbing
- First ascent: 1940 by Karl Prusik (first ascent of the north face)
- Easiest route: From the Taschach Haus over the Taschachferner (glacier)

The Taschachwand is a mountain in the Weisskamm group of the Ötztal Alps best known for its north face. In combination with the north faces of the Petersenspitze and the Hinterer Brochkogel it forms the challenging Ötztaler Eisexpress route to the Wildspitze.
