= Rephotography =

Photographing from the site of a previous photograph

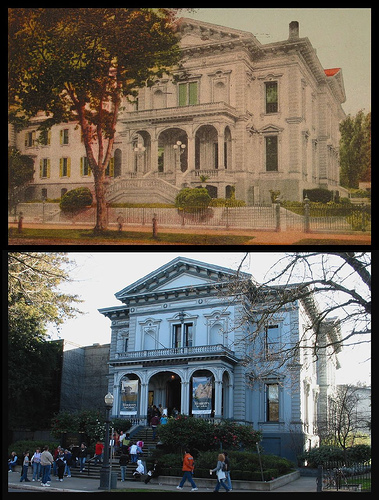
Crocker Art Museum, Sacramento, California

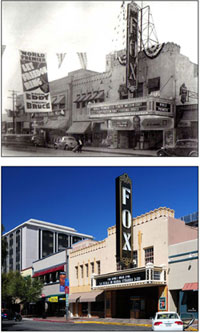
Fox Tucson Theatre, then and 2008

Rephotography or repeat photography is the act of photographing the same site twice, with a time lag between the two images; a diachronic, "then and now" view of a particular area. Some are casual, usually taken from the same view point but without regard to season, lens coverage, or framing. Some are very precise and involve a careful study of the original image.

== Rephotography and photogrammetry in the sciences ==
Since the 1850s techniques were developed for surveying and scientific study, especially in systems (Paganini, 1880; Deville, 1889; Finsterwalder, 1890) of photogrammetry in which precise measurements made from triangulation of points in numbers of photographic records are made in order to track changes in ecological systems.

Rephotography continues to be used by the scientific world to record incremental or cyclical events (of erosion, or land rehabilitation, or glacier flow for example), or to measure the extent of sand banks in a river, or other phenomena which change slowly over time, and in gathering evidence of climate change.

== In social investigation ==
Rephotography has also been a useful diachronic visual method for researchers in sociology and communication to understand social change. Three main approaches are common – photographs of places, participants, or activities, functions, or processes – with scholars examining elements of continuity. This method is advantageous to studying social change due to the capacity of cameras to record scenes with greater completeness and speed, to document detailed complexities at a single time, and to capture images in an unobtrusive manner. Repeat photographs offer "subtle cues about the changing character of social life".

== Procedures and techniques ==
The accurate rephotographer usually determines several facts before taking a new image. An important starting point is the choice of the older image. To show continuity between the two images, rephotographers usually include in the frame a building or other object which is present in the modern view. Some urban scenes change so much that the original buildings shown have been completely obscured by subsequent skyscrapers, or have been demolished. A "then and now" photograph could be taken but there would be nothing in common to link the two images.

The vantage point from which the original photographer took the view may have disappeared over the years, so the rephotographer has to choose an original view for which the vantage point is still accessible, or arrange to rent equipment to duplicate the original position of the camera. Since modern cameras and lenses differ considerably from older in format, the rephotographer also has to take into account the field of view that the lens covers, and the depth of field available.

Through scrutiny of the original image, the rephotographer determines the season and the time of day from observation of the vegetation and the shadows shown. The best way to do this is to set up a camera at the original viewpoint, at approximately the right season and time, and wait with the original view in hand, until the shadows reach the same positions relative to surrounding objects. If done with extreme accuracy it should be possible to place one image over the other, and see the edges of buildings match exactly.

This type of rephotography can be seen in the McCord Museum of Canadian History's virtual exhibition "Urban Life through Two Lenses". It shows the nineteenth-century views of Montreal by William Notman, rephotographed by Andrzej Maciejewski in 2002. Another is Douglas Levere's project New York Changing; here Levere rephotographed 114 of Berenice Abbott's Changing New York images.

== Mobile and computationally assisted digital rephotography ==
Smart phones, because they include both cameras and computing, have the potential to simplify the re-photography process. To date, examples of this include "computational rephotography", an approach that uses feature-matching and structure-from-motion to tell a photographer how to move so that the current view best matches the previous view, and "Collaborative Rephotography", which overlays the current view transparently over the original image to allow the photographer to line up elements of the scene before taking the picture. Specific projects include: re.photos, a web portal to create, browse, search, locate, rate, share, and discuss rephotographs; and Retake Melbourne, a crowd-participatory, crowd-funded, mobile app-enabled Deakin University project to rephotograph the fifty-year-old archive of Melbourne (Australia) streetscapes by Mark Strizic.

== See also ==
- Landscape history
- Time-lapse photography
- Then and Now
- Paul Dorpat
