= Sebastian Finsterwalder =

Bavarian mathematician and surveyor (1862–1951)

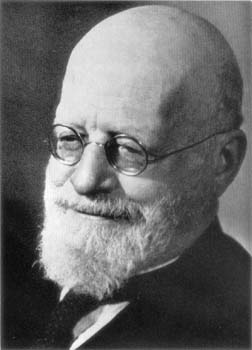
- Born: 4 October 1862; Rosenheim, Kingdom of Bavaria
- Died: 4 December 1951 (aged 89); Munich, Germany
- Education: University of Tübingen
- Known for: Aerodynamics; Photogrammetry; Finsterwaldersche fields method; Froude–Finsterwalder equation
- Spouse: Franziska Mallepell (m. 1892)
- Children: Richard Finsterwalder (1899-1963), Professor at the Technical University in Hanover and Munich, Ulrich Finsterwalder (1897-1988), a civil engineer.
- Awards: Helmert commemorative medallion for excellence by the German Association of Surveying
- Scientific career
- Fields: Mathematics, geometry, surveying, topography, aerodynamics and geology
- Workplaces: Technical University of Munich
- Doctoral advisor: Alexander von Brill
- Doctoral students: Hans Jörg Stetter

Sebastian Finsterwalder (4 October 1862 – 4 December 1951) was a German mathematician and glaciologist. Acknowledged as the "father of glacier photogrammetry"; he pioneered the use of repeat photography as a temporal surveying instrument in measurement of the geology and structure of the Alps and their glacier flows. The measurement techniques he developed and the data he produced are still in use to discover evidence for climate change. (Note: Terrestrial (ground-based or close-range) photogrammetry was one of the first successful methods for detecting and quantifying surface changes in rock glaciers. Flow velocity was a typical parameter derived from this. The 2D or even 3D kinematics of the rock glacier surface is needed for rheological models. In recent years, active rock glaciers have also become the focus of climate change research. Climate warming influences flow/creep velocity of rock glaciers, which can thus be seen as indicators of environmental change in mountainous regions. Melting of the subsurface ice causes surface lowering, which in the worst case may lead to active landslide activity and even a total collapse of the rock glacier surface.)

== Life ==
Sebastian Finsterwalder was born 4 October 1862 in Rosenheim, son of Johann Nepomuk Finsterwalder, a master baker from Antdorf near Weilheim, Upper Bavaria, and Anna Amman of Rosenheim. He died 4 December 1951 in Munich). He was a Bavarian mathematician and surveyor. In 1892 he married Franziska Mallepell (d. 1953) from Brixen, South Tyrol. Their two sons worked in similar fields; Richard Finsterwalder (1899-1963), Professor at the Technical University in Hanover and Munich, and Ulrich Finsterwalder (1897-1988), a civil engineer.

A keen mountaineer, Finsterwalder became interested, through the influence of his friend E. Richter, in alpine fossils as indicators of the geology and structure of the Alps and their glaciers. His desire for accurate, but also less costly, motion measurements on glaciers led him to glaciological applications of photogrammetry in geodesy.

In 1886, aged 24, he received his doctorate from the University of Tübingen, under the guidance of the algebraic geometer Alexander von Brill. Finsterwalder observed that Rudolf Sturm's analysis of the "homography problem" (1869) can be used to solve the problem of 3D-reconstruction using point matches in two images; which is the mathematical foundation of photogrammetry.

Finsterwalder pioneered geodetic surveys in the high mountains. At the age of 27 years he conducted a first glacier mapping project at Vernagtferner in the Ötztal Alps, Austria.

== Research and applications of photogrammetry ==
Following the 1878 work of Italian engineer Pio Paganini of the Istituto Geografico Militare (Note: Finsterwalder remarked in 1890 that in Italy, thousands of square kilometres of alpine territory had already been photographically surveyed—with hardly anyone taking notice in Germany. What astonished Finsterwalder most was the skill with which the topographers of the I.G.M. [Istituto Topografico Militare] transformed the photos into maps. Anyone with an interest in mapmaking "will absorb himself with greatest pleasure into the many details of this map and will never stop to admire the accuracy and fidelity with which everything is overheard from nature.") and others, (Note: Photogrammetry – the art of making measurements using images – is the task of determining an object or its dimensions using photographs. Preliminary work on this problem was done by Lambert in what he referred to as "inverting the perspective" and by Beautemps-Beaupre (1791-1793). In surveying these methods were first tested by A. Laussedat (1852-59). Starting in 1855 I. Porro began developing instruments for photogrammetry. A. Meydenbauer brought architectural photogrammetry to high level. W. Jordan17 and C. Koppe approached the problem from the standpoint of geodesy, and G. Hauck approached it from a theoretical point of view. Photogrammetry was practiced on a large scale in Italy by L. P. Paganini since 1880 and in Canada by E. Deville since 1889. S. Finsterwalder has been doing aerial photogrammetry from balloons since 1890. C. Pulfrich has been using stereoscopy since 1890. A. Laussedat has collected material on the history of photographic methods and equipment.") Finstenwalder advanced methods for reconstruction and measurements of three-dimensional objects from photographic images.

He was appointed professor at the Technical University of Munich in 1891, succeeding his teacher, A. Voss, at the Department of Analytical Geometry, Differential and Integral Calculus. He stayed at the university for forty years, until 1931. In 1892, he married, and completed the first recording of the Bavarian glacier in Wettersteingebirge and the Berchtesgaden Alps.

He applied the technique of plane table photogrammetry in addition to a conventional geodetic survey, assisted by the novel lightweight, accurate phototheodolite that he had developed for high-mountain applications. The device was based on the prototype phototheodolite developed by Albrecht Meydenbauer (1834-1921) for architectural applications. From 1890 Finsterwalder also employed aerial photography, reconstituting the topography of the area of Gars am Inn in 1899 from a pair of balloon photographs using mathematical calculations of many points in the images.

In 1897 Finsterwalder addressed the German Mathematical Society, and he described some of the results of projective geometry he was applying to photogrammetry. His theory of large triangle meshes became known as the "Finsterwaldersche fields method" (1915). His analytical approach was laborious however, prompting development of analogue instrumentation with stereo measurement permitting faster optical/mechanical reconstruction of the photographic data arrays to determine object points. This was assisted by new technology; Carl Pulfrich's stereocomparator (1901) and Eduard Ritter von Orel's stereoautograph (1907), both instruments built by the company Carl Zeiss.

In 1911 he took over the chair of descriptive geometry, turning down offers of appointment from Vienna, Berlin and Potsdam.

== Aerodynamics ==
Felix Klein commissioned Finsterwalder while the latter was professor of mathematics at the Munich polytechnic, to write on aerodynamics for his Enzyklopädie der mathematischen Wissenschaften mit Einschluss ihrer Anwendungen (EMW) (tr. 'Encyclopedia of mathematical sciences including their applications'). The article, which he submitted in August 1902, more than a year before the Wrights achieved powered flight was prescient in its insights into the mathematics behind this new field of engineering. Finsterwalder also worked with Martin Kutta (1867–1944) at the Institute in Munich to devise formulas relating to the lift on an aerofoil in terms of the circulation round it. Finsterwalder assisted with Kutta's 1902 habilitation thesis, which contains the Kutta-Joukowski theorem giving estimates of the lift of aerofoils.

== Glacier flow in the Ötztal Alps ==
In 1922 Finsterwalder mapped the topography of the Ötztal Alps (Note: These Alps are the location in which 'Ötzi the Iceman' was found; a well-preserved natural mummy of a man who lived about 3,300 BCE.) focusing on two glaciers, i.e. Gepatschferner and Weißseeferner, using stereophotogrammetry. During this work he discovered Ölgruben rock glacier and the rock glacier north of Krummgampenspitze. In 1923 and 1924 Finsterwalder measured a flow velocity profile across Ölgruben rock glacier. Because of Finsterwalder's efforts, Ölgruben rock glacier became the subject of a notably extended, longitudinal study of flow velocity with high value in climate research, with repeat surveys undertaken by Wolfgang Pillewizer in 1938, 1939, and 1953 using photogrammetry, and which is still ongoing, employing modern satellite-based positioning techniques. His son Richard assisted in the mapping project in the Ötztal Alps and went on to advance his father's studies.

== Other contributions ==
Under his leadership the Bavarian International Commission for Geodesy undertook precise gravity measurements with relative gravimeters throughout Bavaria.

== Honours ==
- 1965 Finsterwalder High School in his birthplace Rosenheim was named after him.
- Finsterwalder Glacier is named after him.
- 1915 President of the German Mathematical Society.
- 1943 awarded Helmert commemorative medallion for excellence by the German Association of Surveying.
- 1938 Asteroid 1482 (Sebastiana) was named after him.

== Publications ==
- Finsterwalder, S. (1890) "Die Photogrammetrie in den italienischen Hochalpen," Mittheilungen des Deutschen und Österreichischen Alpenvereins, vol. 16, nº 1, 1890, pp. 6–9
- Finsterwalder, S., Muret, E., (1901). Les variations périodiques des glaciers. VIme Rapport, 1900. Extrait des Archives des Sciences physiques et naturelles 106/4 (12), 118–131.
- Finsterwalder, S., Muret, E., (1902). Les variations périodiques des glaciers. VIIme Rapport, 1901. Extrait des Archives des Sciences physiques et naturelles 107/4 (14), 282– 302.
- Finsterwalder, S., Muret, E., (1903). Les variations périodiques des glaciers. VIIIme Rapport, 1902. Extrait des Archives des Sciences physiques et naturelles 108/4 (15), 661– 677.
- Finsterwalder, S., (1928) Geleitworte zur Karte des Gepatschferners. Zeitschrift für Gletscherkunde, 16, 20–41.
- Finsterwalder's 1901 German patents for making balloon sheaths, #125058 and #132472, at the German patent office DPMA web site

== See also ==
- Plane table
- Rephotography

== Literature and links ==
- Seligman, G. (1949) Research on Glacier Flow. An Historical Outline. Geografiska Annaler, Vol. 31, Glaciers and Climate: Geophysical and Geomorphological Essays, Wiley / Swedish Society for Anthropology and Geography pp. 228–238
- Kaufmann, V. (2012) The evolution of rock glacier monitoring using terrestrial photogrammetry: the example of Äußeres Hochebenkar rock glacier (Austria) Austrian Journal of Earth Sciences Volume 105/2 Vienna 2012 pp. 63–77
- Leather Charles Steger : Astronomical and Physical Geodesy Volume 5 of the "Manual of Surveying" (ed. Jordan Eggert Kneissl, publishing JBMetzler, Stuttgart in 1969.
- Walther Welsch et al. evaluation of geodetic monitoring measurements. Manual of Engineering Geodesy (ed. M.Möser, H.Schlemmer et al.), Wichmann-Verlag Heidelberg, 2000.
- G. Clauß, in: Zs. f. Vermessungswesen, 1932, S. 721-26 ( P );
- R. Rehlen, H. Heß u. M. Lagally, in: Zs. f. Gletscherkde. 20, 1932, S. IX-XXI ( P )
- O. v. Gruber, in: S. F. z. 75. Geburtstag, Festschr. d. Dt. Ges. f. Photogrammetrie, 1937;
- M. Kneißl, S. F. z. 80. Geburtstag, in: Bildmessung u. Luftbildwesen 17, 1942, S. 53-64 ( vollst. W- Verz., 123 Nr. )
- ders., in: Zs. f. Vermessungswesen 77, 1952, S. 1-3 ( P )
- Richard Finsterwalder, in: SB d. Bayer. Ak. d. Wiss., 1953, S. 257;
- ders., in: Geist u. Gestalt, Biogr. Btrr. z. Gesch. d. Bayer. Ak. d. Wiss...II, 1959, S. 65-69 ( L )
- G. Faber, ebd., S. 34 f. ( P ebd. III, S. 183);
- Pogg. IV-VII a. – Slg. math. Modelle v. F. im Math. Inst. d. TH München.
