= Texelspitze =

Mountain in Italy

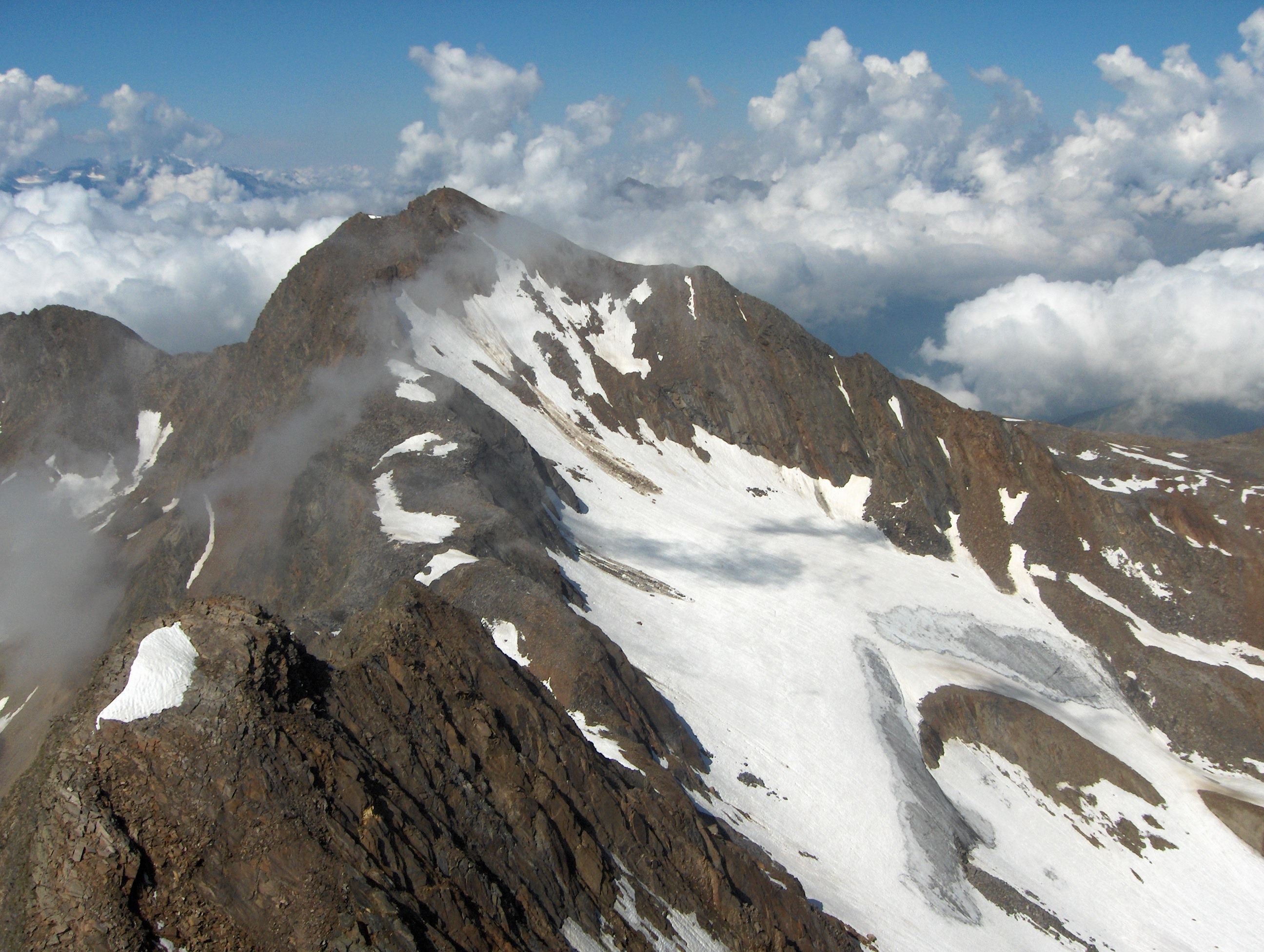
- Texelspitze from Roteck

Highest point
- Elevation: 3,318 m (10,886 ft)
- Prominence: 145 m (476 ft)
- Parent peak: Roteck
- Coordinates: 46°43′15″N 10°58′17″E

Geography
- Location within Alps
- Location: South Tyrol, Italy
- Parent range: Ötztal Alps

Climbing
- First ascent: 22 jul 1871 by Theodor Petersen and his guides L. Ennemoser and J. Hellriegl
- Easiest route: Over the southeast face

The Texelspitze (Italian: Cima Tessa) is the second highest mountain in the Texel group (Gruppo di Tessa) of the Ötztal Alps. The highest mountain of this group is Roteck which is 19m higher.
