= Battle of Texel (disambiguation) =

The Battle of Texel was part of the Franco-Dutch War fought in 1673.

Battle of Texel may also refer to:

- Battle of Scheveningen, fought near Texel in 1653
- Battle of Texel (1673) or Battle of Kijkduin
- Battle of Texel (1694), part of the Nine Years' War
- Battle off Texel (1914), part of the First World War
- Georgian uprising on Texel, part of the Second World War
- Capture of the Dutch fleet at Den Helder in 1795, part of the War of the First Coalition

== See also ==
- The Battle of Texel (Isabey), an 1839 painting by Eugène Isabey
