= Lodner =

Mountain in Italy

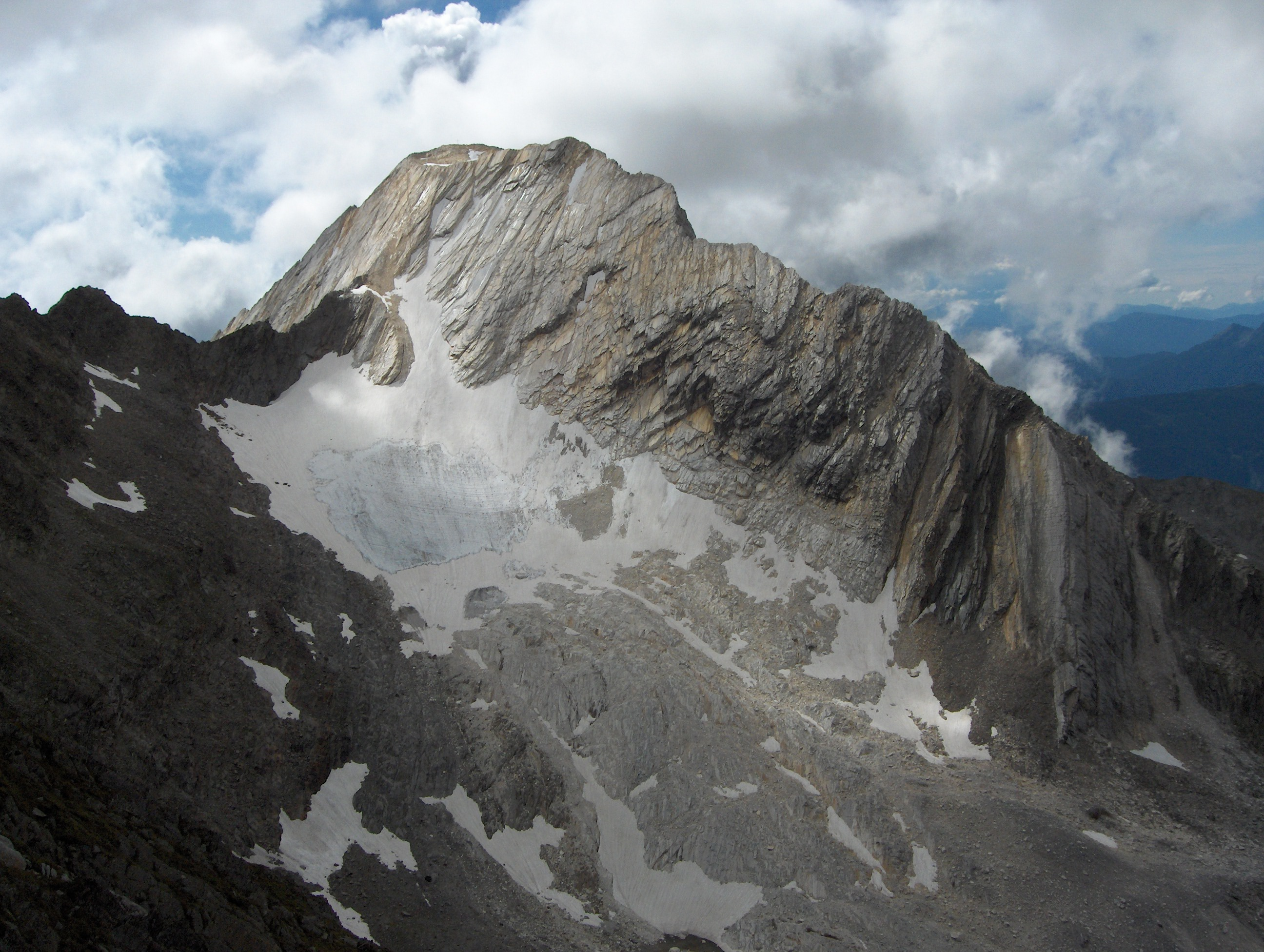
- Lodner from Kleine Weisse

Highest point
- Elevation: 3,219 m (10,561 ft)
- Prominence: 190 m (620 ft)
- Parent peak: Hohe Weiße
- Coordinates: 46°44′6″N 11°02′19″E

Geography
- Location within Italy
- Location: South Tyrol, Italy
- Parent range: Ötztal Alps

Climbing
- First ascent: 23 July 1872 by Victor Hecht and Johann Pinggera
- Easiest route: North face from the Lodner Hütte over the Lodnerferner (UIAA-II)

The Lodner is a mountain in the Ötztal Alps in South Tyrol, Italy.
