= Vorderer Brochkogel =

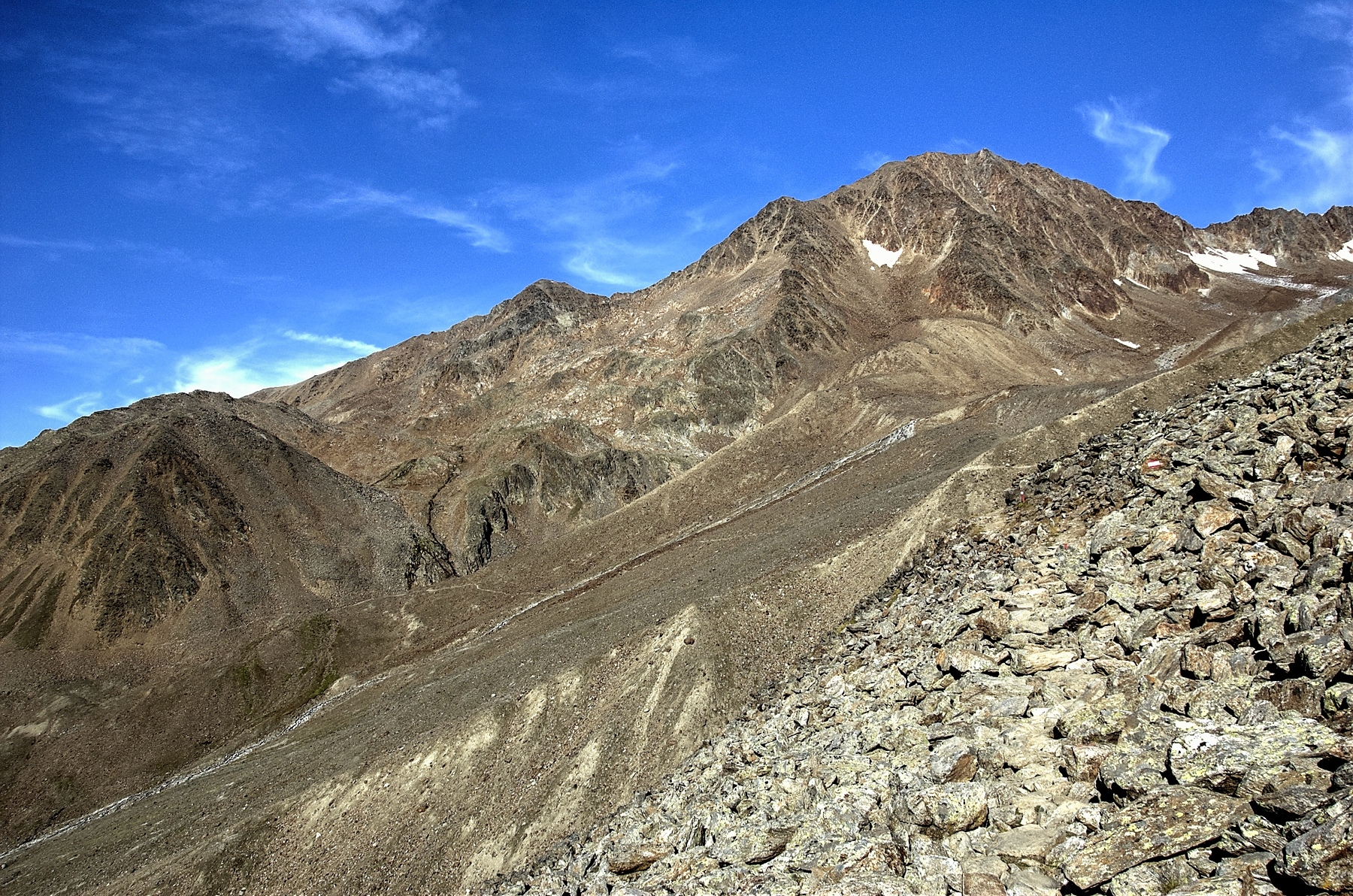
- Vorderer Brochkogel.

Highest point
- Elevation: 3,565 m (11,696 ft)
- Prominence: 169 m (554 ft)
- Parent peak: Hinterer Brochkogel (Wildspitze)
- Coordinates: 46°52′29″N 10°51′03″E

Geography
- Location within Austria
- Location: Tyrol, Austria
- Parent range: Ötztal Alps

Climbing
- First ascent: 1851 during a geological survey
- Easiest route: South ridge from the Breslauer Hütte or Vernagthütte

The Vorderer Brochkogel (German pronunciation: [ˈfɔʁdəʀɐ ˈbʀɔχˌkoːɡl̩]) is a mountain in the Weisskamm group of the Ötztal Alps.
