= Gfallwand =

Mountain in Italy

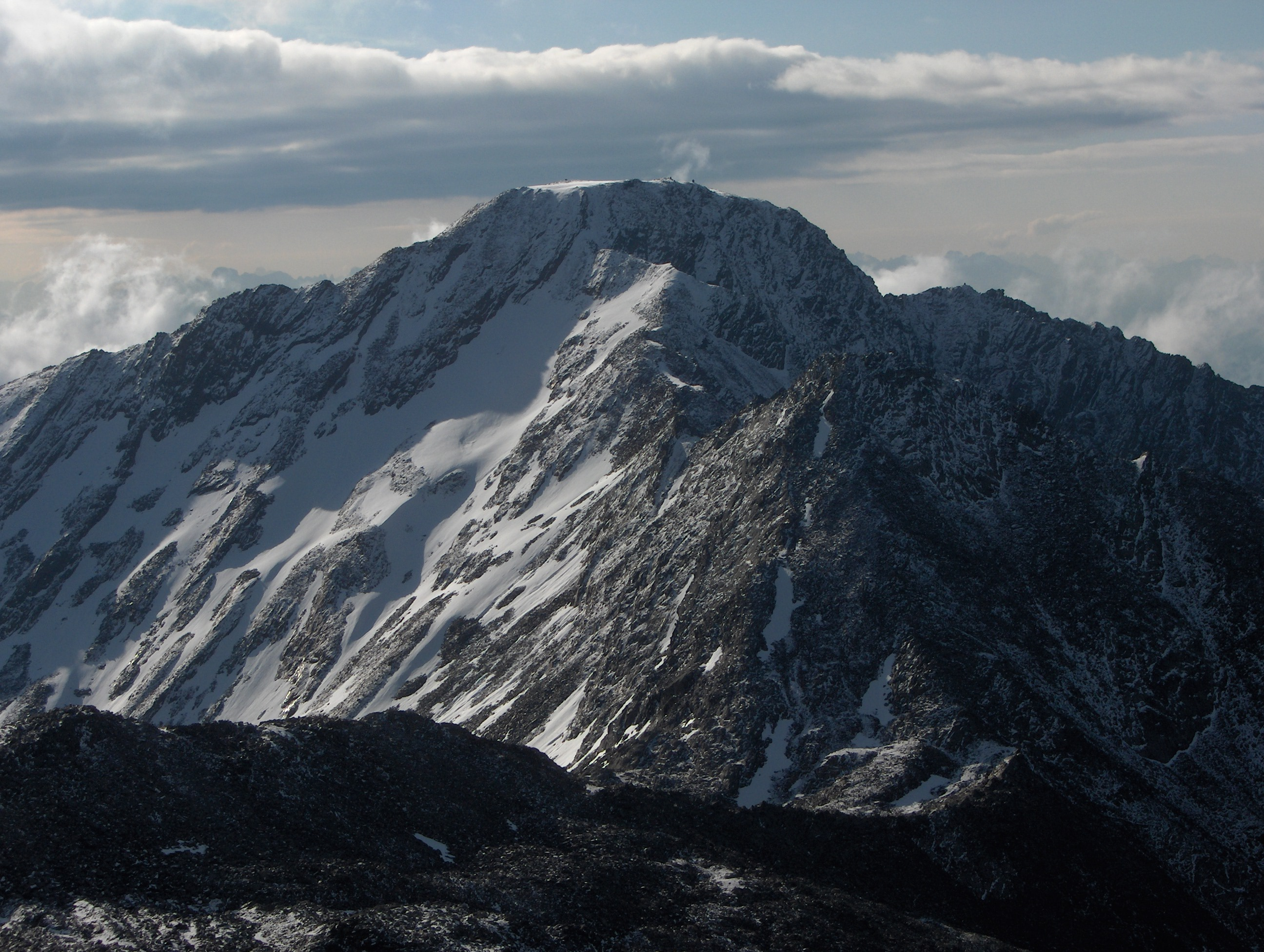

Highest point
- Elevation: 3,175 m (10,417 ft)
- Prominence: 233 m (764 ft)
- Coordinates: 46°41′57″N 10°59′45″E

Geography
- Location within Alps
- Location: South Tyrol, Italy
- Parent range: Ötztal Alps

Climbing
- Easiest route: From the Ginggljoch

The Gfallwand (Italian: Croda del Tovale) is a mountain in the Texel group of the Ötztal Alps. Parent peaks are the Zielspitze, Lahnbachspitze and Schwarze Wand. On the south side of the mountain is also a little lake, Pircher Lacke. The easiest route to the summit leads along the Ginggljoch.
