= Texelgruppe Nature Park =

Protected area in Italy

Coordinates: 46.75°N 11.04°E

Naturpark Texelgruppe
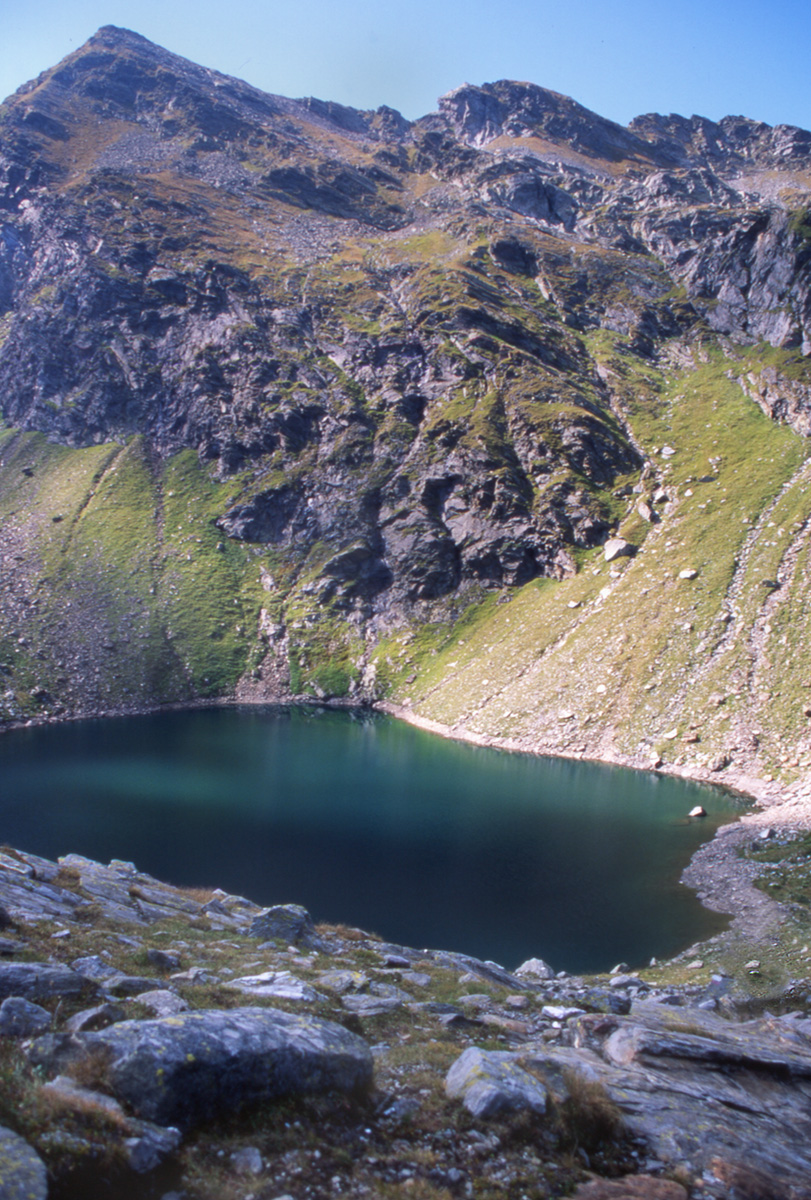
- Interactive map of Naturpark Texelgruppe
- Location: South Tyrol, Italy
- Area: 33,430 ha (82,607 acres)
- Established: 1976
- Website: www.provinz.bz.it/natur/2803/index_e.asp

The Texelgruppe Nature Park (German: Naturpark Texelgruppe) is a nature reserve in South Tyrol, Italy. It has a total area of 33,430 hectares.

== Geography ==
It extends from Merano in the south to the Schnalstal in the west and the Passeier Valley to the east, while the Central Alpine Divide forms its northern border.
