= Hinterer Brunnenkogel =

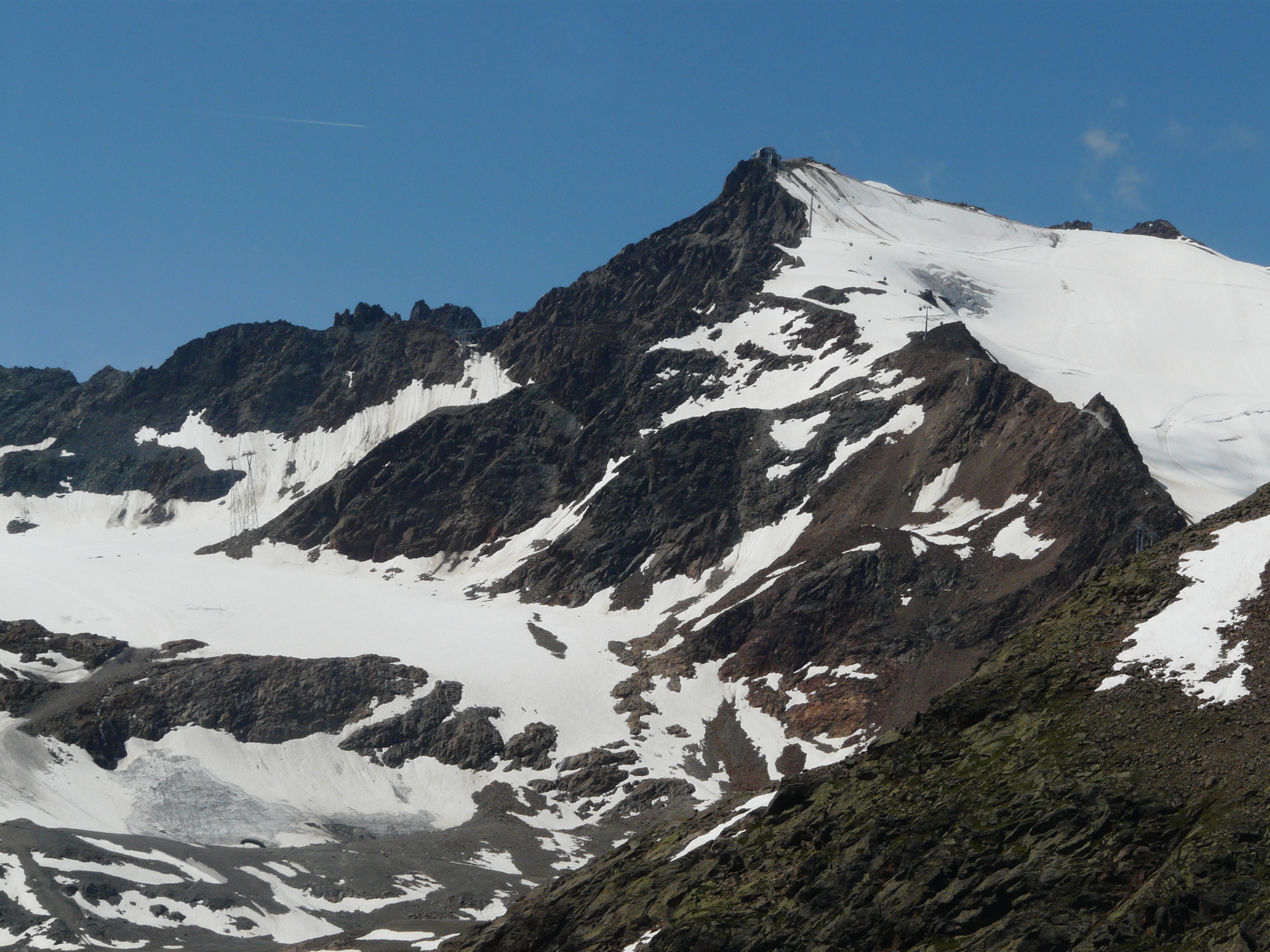

Highest point
- Elevation: 3,440 m (11,290 ft)
- Prominence: 272 m (892 ft)
- Parent peak: Wildspitze
- Coordinates: 46°54′46″N 10°51′41″E

Geography
- Location within Austria
- Location: Tyrol, Austria
- Parent range: Ötztal Alps

Climbing
- First ascent: 10 Jul 1873 by Isaak Dobler, Dr. Haeberlin, Josef Kirchner and Theodor Petersen
- Easiest route: North face from the Braunschweiger Hütte

The Hinterer Brunnenkogel is a mountain in the Weisskamm group of the Ötztal Alps. Its summit can be reached with the highest aerial tramway in Austria.
