= Hintereisspitzen =

Mountain in Italy

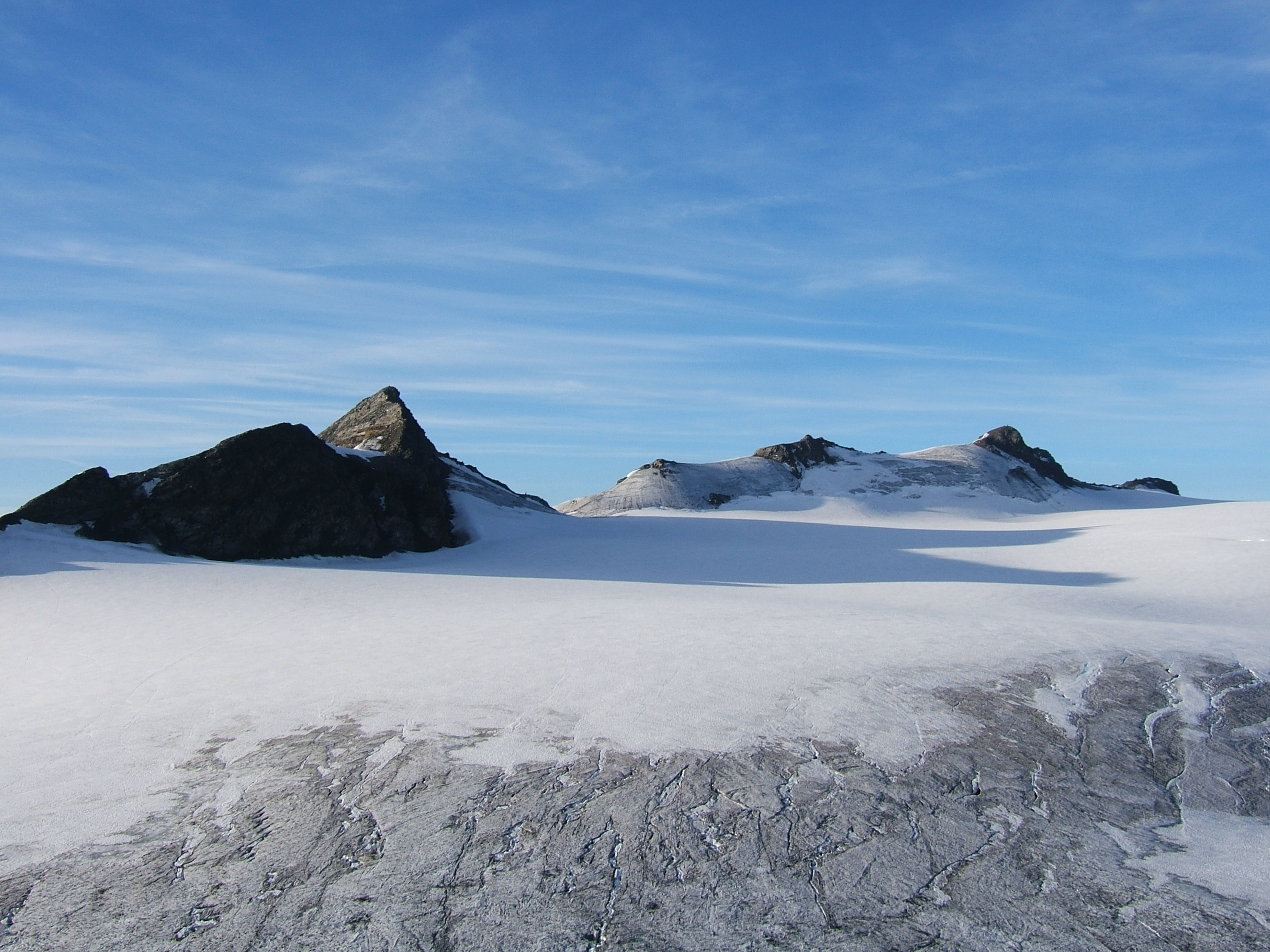
- The three Hintereisspitzen from the north from the Brandenburger Haus as seen over the Gepatschferner, second-largest glacier in the Eastern Alps.

Highest point
- Elevation: 3,486 m (11,437 ft)
- Prominence: 270 m (890 ft)
- Parent peak: Fluchtkogel (Hochvernagtspitze)
- Coordinates: 46°49′22″N 10°45′52″E

Geography
- Location within Austria
- Location: Tyrol, Austria / South Tyrol, Italy
- Parent range: Ötztal Alps

Climbing
- First ascent: 28 Jul 1875 by Theodor Petersen and A. Ennemoser
- Easiest route: Von Norden über den Gepatschferner

The Hintereisspitzen are three peaks in the Weisskamm group of the Ötztal Alps.
