= Roteck =

Mountain in Italy

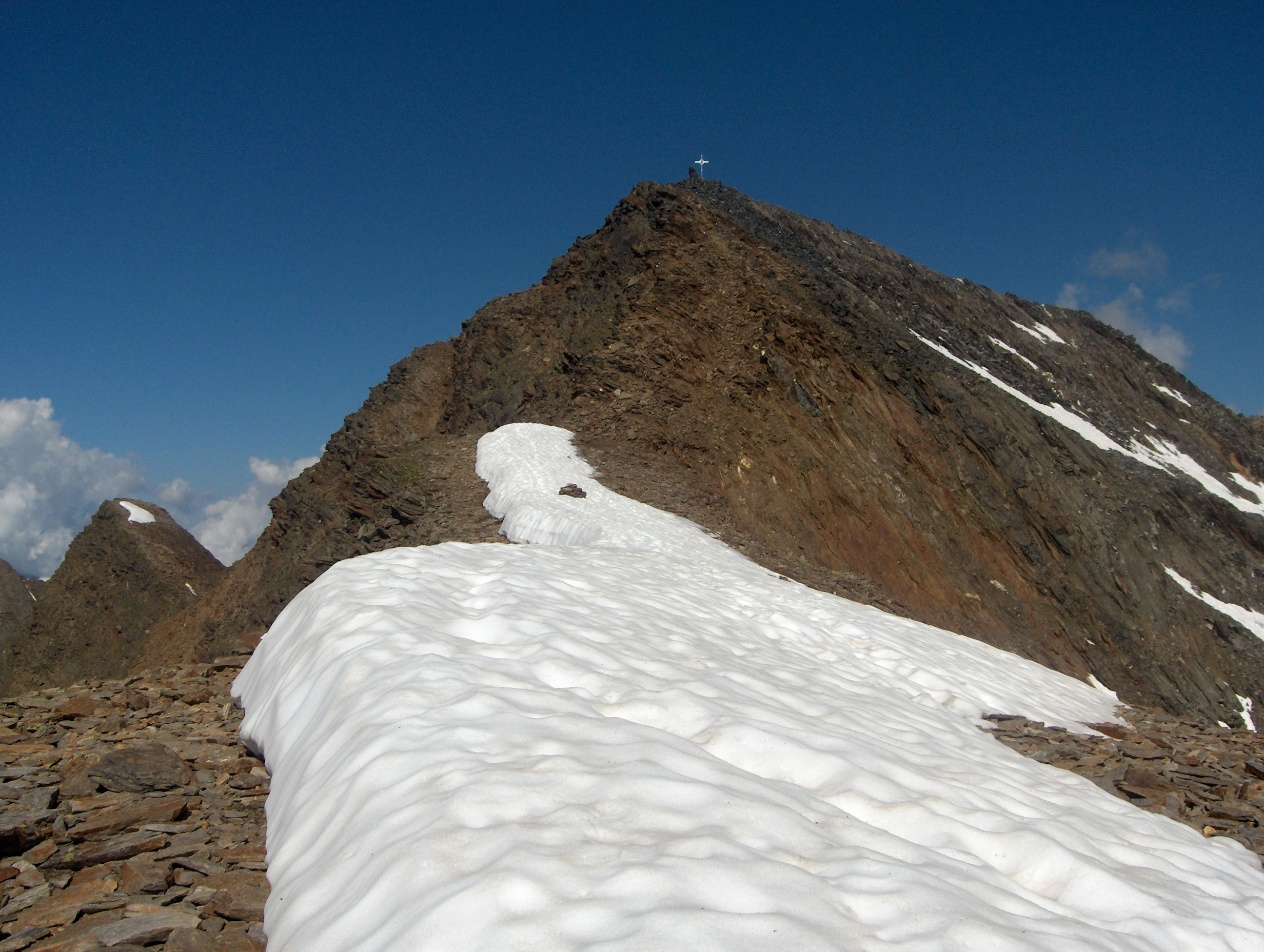

Highest point
- Elevation: 3,337 m (10,948 ft)
- Prominence: 483 m (1,585 ft)
- Parent peak: Hohe Weiße (Hintere Schwärze)
- Listing: Alpine mountains above 3000 m
- Coordinates: 46°43′25″N 10°59′03″E

Geography
- Location within Alps
- Location: South Tyrol, Italy
- Parent range: Ötztal Alps

Climbing
- First ascent: 14 Jul 1872 by Theodor Petersen, Rochus Raffeiner, Illdefons Kobler
- Easiest route: East ridge (UIAA-I) from the Lodner Hütte

The Roteck (Italian: Monte Rosso) is the highest peak in the Texel group of the Ötztal Alps.

== See also ==
- List of mountains of the Alps
