= Spronser Rötelspitze =

Mountain in the Ötztal Alps in South Tyrol, Italy

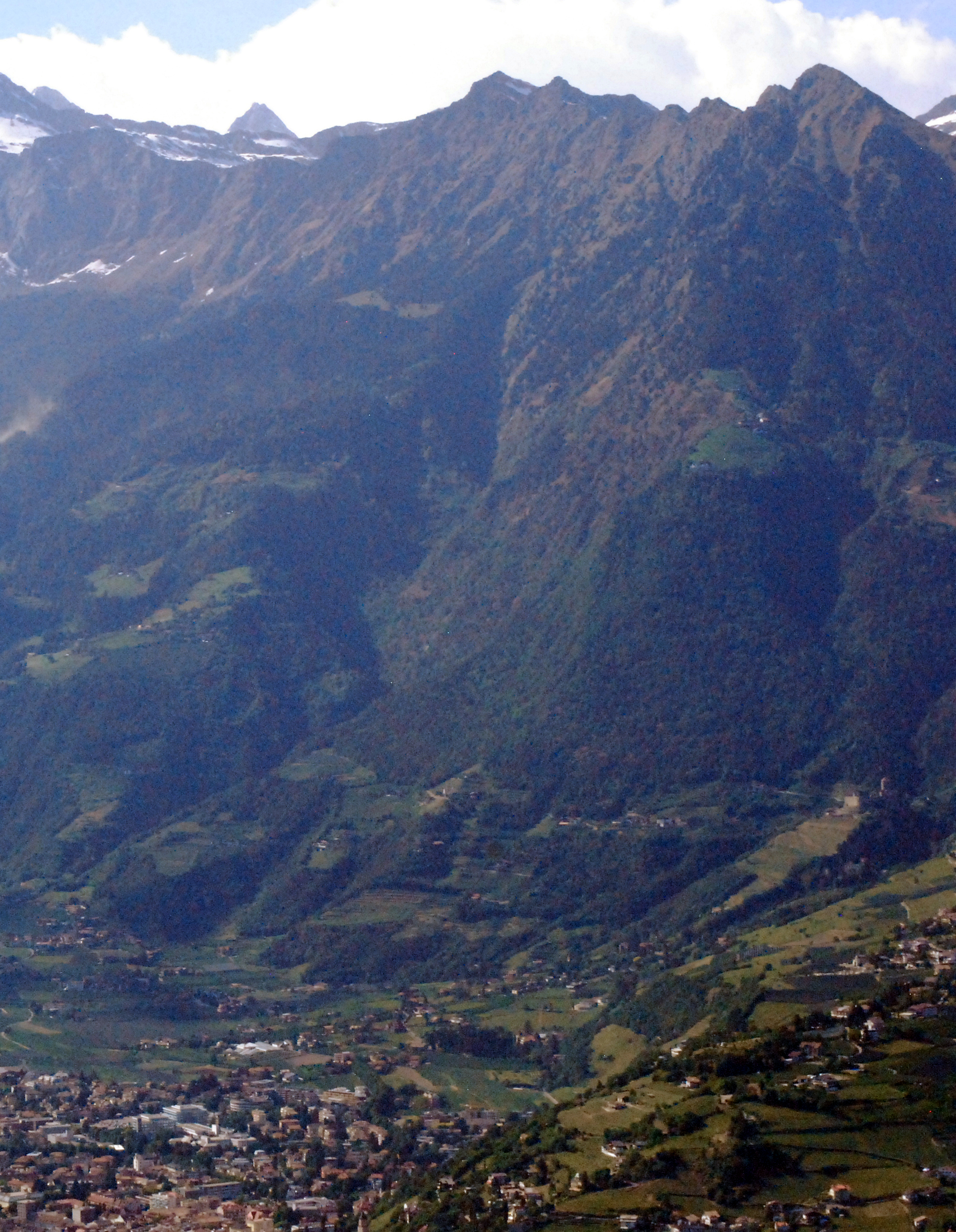
- Spronser Rötelspitze (center) above Merano, from the southeast.

Highest point
- Elevation: 2,625 m (8,612 ft)
- Coordinates: 46°43′24″N 11°05′31″E

Geography
- Location within Alps
- Location: South Tyrol, Italy
- Parent range: Ötztal Alps

The Spronser Rötelspitze is a mountain in the Ötztal Alps in South Tyrol, Italy.
