= Hohe Weisse =

Mountain in Italy

- Cima Bianca Grande
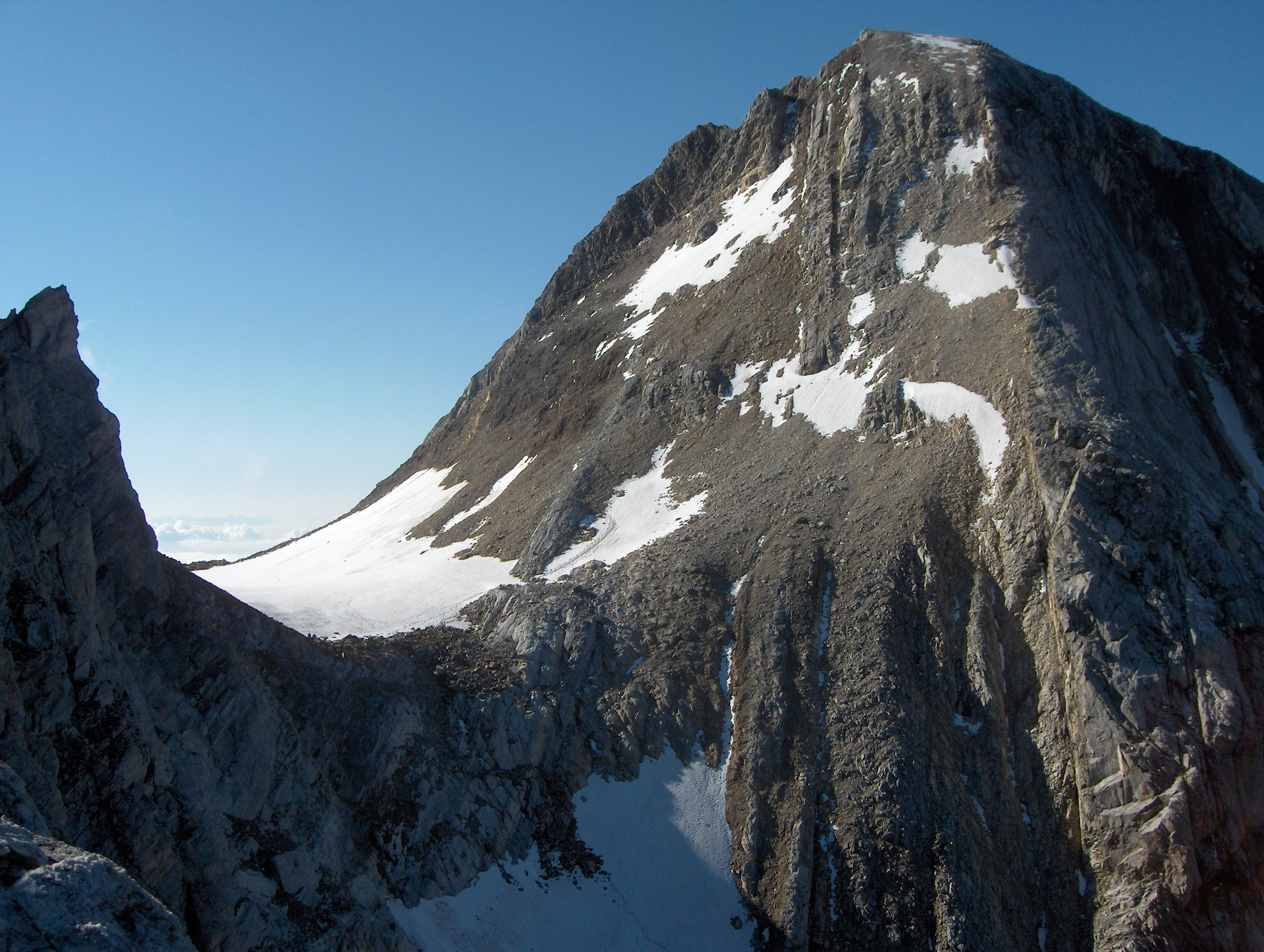

Highest point
- Elevation: 3,278 m (10,755 ft)
- Prominence: 384 m (1,260 ft)
- Parent peak: Hochwilde
- Listing: Alpine mountains above 3000 m
- Coordinates: 46°44′44″N 11°02′14″E

Geography
- Location within Alps
- Location: South Tyrol, Italy
- Parent range: Ötztal Alps

Climbing
- Easiest route: Willy-Ahrens-weg

The Hohe Weisse or Hochweisse (Italian: Cima Bianca Grande) is a mountain in the Texel group of the Ötztal Alps. Its parent peak is the Hochwilde. The easiest route to the summit is the Willy-Ahrens-weg.
