= Hinterer Brochkogel =

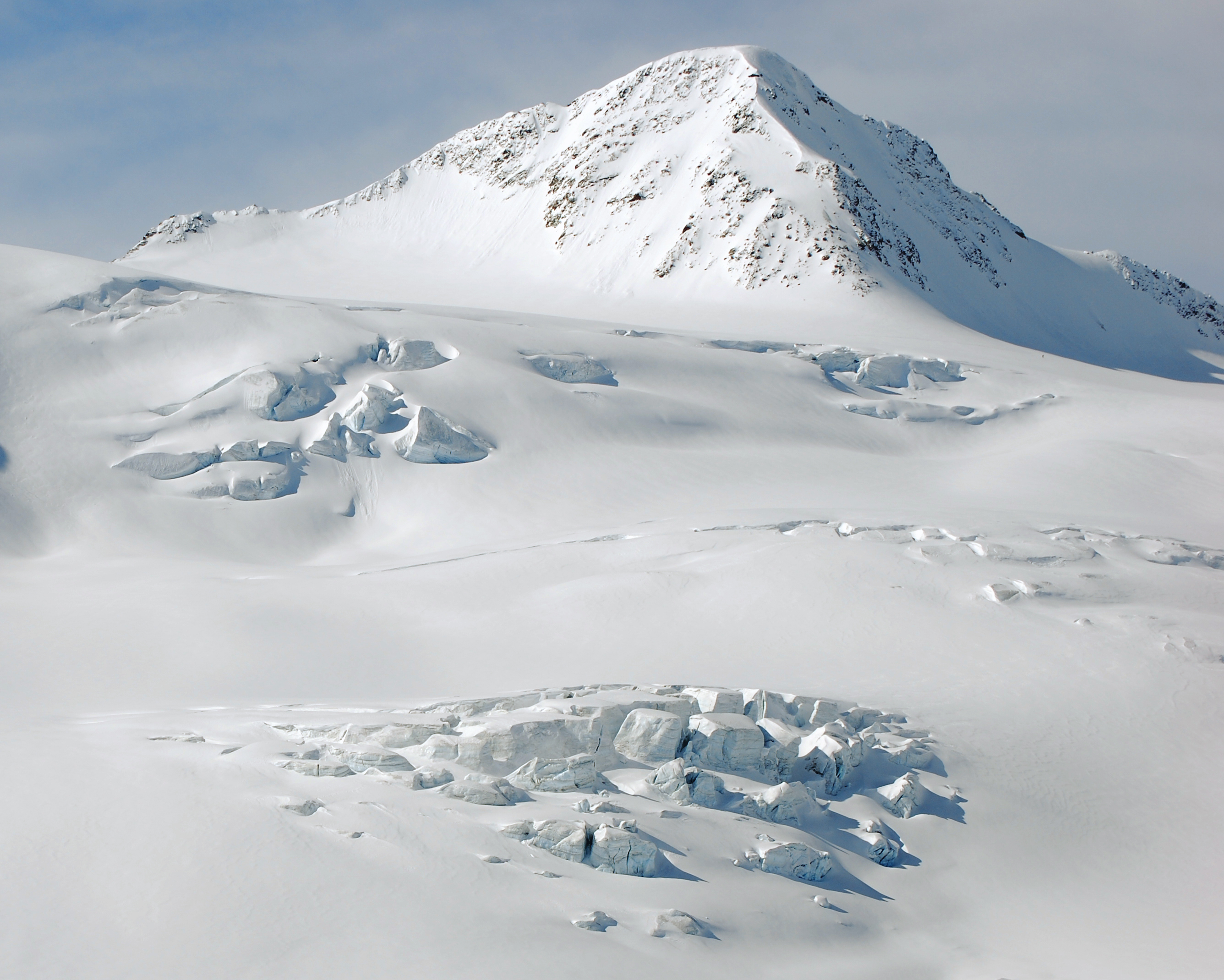
- Hinterer Brochkogel from NE over the Taschachferner

Highest point
- Elevation: 3,635 m (11,926 ft)
- Prominence: 153 m (502 ft)
- Parent peak: Wildspitze
- Coordinates: 46°53′10″N 10°50′59″E

Geography
- Location within Austria
- Location: Tyrol, Austria
- Parent range: Ötztal Alps

Climbing
- First ascent: 2 Aug 1858 by Leander Klotz, Albert Wachtler
- Easiest route: Southeast ridge from the Breslauer Hütte

The Hinterer Brochkogel (German pronunciation: [ˈhɪntəʀɐ ˈbʀɔχˌkoːɡl̩]) is a mountain in the Weisskamm group of the Ötztal Alps.
