= 2020 Pacific typhoon season =

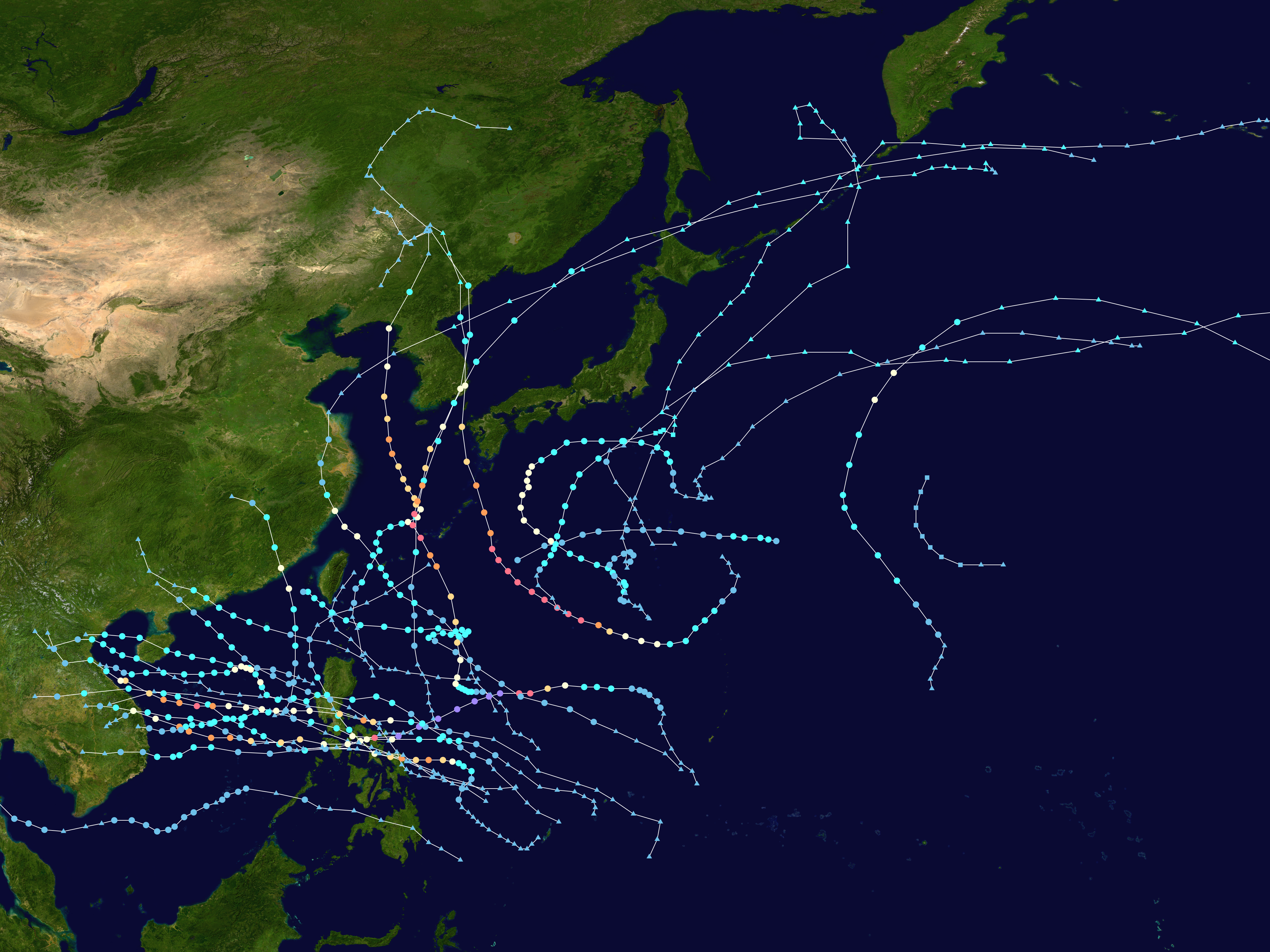
- Season summary map

Seasonal boundaries
- First system formed: May 8, 2020
- Last system dissipated: December 29, 2020

Strongest storm
- Name: Goni
  - Maximum winds: 220 km/h (140 mph) (10-minute sustained)
  - Lowest pressure: 905 hPa (mbar)

Seasonal statistics
- Total depressions: 32
- Total storms: 23
- Typhoons: 10
- Very strong typhoons: 7
- Violent typhoons: 2
- Total fatalities: 472 total
- Total damage: $5.35 billion (2020 USD)

Related articles
- Timeline of the 2020 Pacific typhoon season; 2020 Atlantic hurricane season; 2020 Pacific hurricane season; 2020 North Indian Ocean cyclone season

The 2020 Pacific typhoon season was the first of a series of four below average Pacific typhoon seasons, and became the first with below-average tropical cyclone activity since 2014, with 23 named storms, 10 of which became typhoons and only 2 became super typhoons. This low activity was a consequence of La Niña that persisted from the summer of the year. It had the seventh-latest start in the basin on record, slightly behind 1973, and was the first to start that late since 2016. The first half of the season was unusually inactive, with only four systems, two named storms and one typhoon at the end of July. Additionally, the JTWC recorded no tropical cyclone development in the month of July, the first such occurrence since reliable records began. Despite that, this season featured Typhoon Goni, which made the strongest landfall worldwide in terms of 1-minute wind speed. The season ran throughout 2020, though most tropical cyclones typically develop between May and November. The season's first named tropical cyclone, Vongfong, developed on May 8, while the season's last named tropical cyclone, Krovanh, dissipated on December 24. However, the season's last system was an unnamed tropical depression which dissipated on December 29.

The scope of this article is limited to the Pacific Ocean to the north of the equator between 100°E and 180th meridian. Within the northwestern Pacific Ocean, there are two separate agencies that assign names to tropical cyclones which can often result in a cyclone having two names. The Japan Meteorological Agency (JMA) will name a tropical cyclone should it be judged to have 10-minute sustained wind speeds of at least 65 kilometers per hour (40 mph) anywhere in the basin, whilst the Philippine Atmospheric, Geophysical and Astronomical Services Administration (PAGASA) assigns names to tropical cyclones which move into or form as a tropical depression in their area of responsibility located between 135°E and 115°E and between 5°N–25°N regardless of whether or not a tropical cyclone has already been given a name by the JMA. Tropical depressions that are monitored by the United States' Joint Typhoon Warning Center (JTWC) are given a number with a "W" suffix.

== Seasonal forecasts ==
TSR forecasts Date	Tropical storms	Total Typhoons	Intense TCs	ACE	Ref.
Average (1965–2019)	26	16	9	294	
May 21, 2020	26	15	8	258	
July 9, 2020	26	14	7	216	
August 6, 2020	21	13	5	157	
Other forecasts Date	Forecast Center	Period		Systems	Ref.
January 22, 2020	PAGASA	January–March		0–4 tropical cyclones	
January 22, 2020	PAGASA	April–June		3–6 tropical cyclones	
June 24, 2020	PAGASA	July–September		6–12 tropical cyclones	
June 24, 2020	PAGASA	October–December		4–8 tropical cyclones	
2020 season	Forecast Center	Tropical cyclones	Tropical storms	Typhoons	Ref.
Actual activity:	JMA	32	23	10	
Actual activity:	JTWC	26	23	12	
Actual activity:	PAGASA	22	15	7	

During the year several national meteorological services and scientific agencies forecast how many tropical cyclones, tropical storms, and typhoons will form during a season and/or how many tropical cyclones will affect a particular country. These agencies include the Tropical Storm Risk (TSR) Consortium of University College London, PAGASA and Taiwan's Central Weather Bureau. The first forecast for the year was released by PAGASA on January 22 predicting the first half of 2020, within its monthly seasonal climate outlook. The PAGASA predicts that only 0–4 tropical cyclones are expected to form or enter the Philippine Area of Responsibility between January and March, while 3–6 tropical cyclones are expected to form between April and June. This was due to the fact that the El Niño–Southern Oscillation was seeing neutral conditions across the Pacific, and could persist until midyear. On May 21, the TSR issued their extended-range forecast for 2020, forecasting tropical activity below the average normal, with 26 tropical storms, 15 typhoons and 8 intense typhoons. These numbers were supported by the current values from the Indian Ocean Dipole, the Accumulated Cyclone Energy index and the sea-surface temperatures in the Niño 3.75 region, leading to a stronger than normal trade windspeed throughout much of the Western Pacific.

On June 24, the PAGASA issued a climate forecast, predicting the number of tropical cyclones for the second half of the season. They predicted that 6–12 tropical cyclones are expected to form between the months of July and September, while 4–8 tropical cyclones are expected to form between the months of October and December. On July 9, TSR issued their forecast for the season, predicting a well-below average season with 26 named storms, 14 typhoons and only 7 intense typhoons. On August 6, TSR issued their third and final forecast for the season, lowering their numbers to 21 named storms, 13 typhoons and 5 intense typhoons. They mentioned that the 2020 season is expected to be one of the "least active typhoon seasons on record", with a predicted ACE index barely half of the normal and a 96% probability of being a below-average season.

== Systems ==
=== Typhoon Vongfong (Ambo) ===
- Very strong typhoon (JMA)
- Category 3 typhoon (SSHWS)
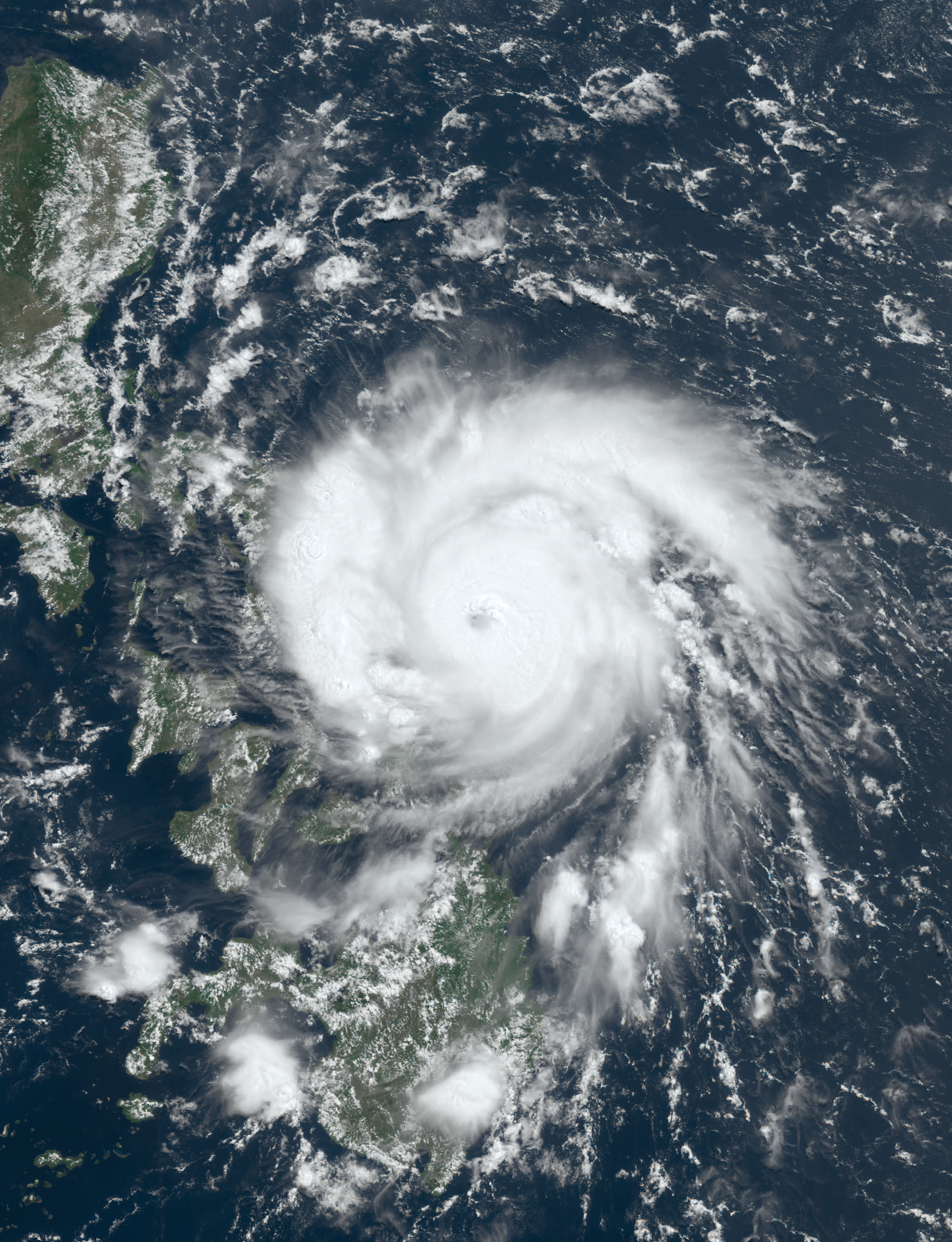
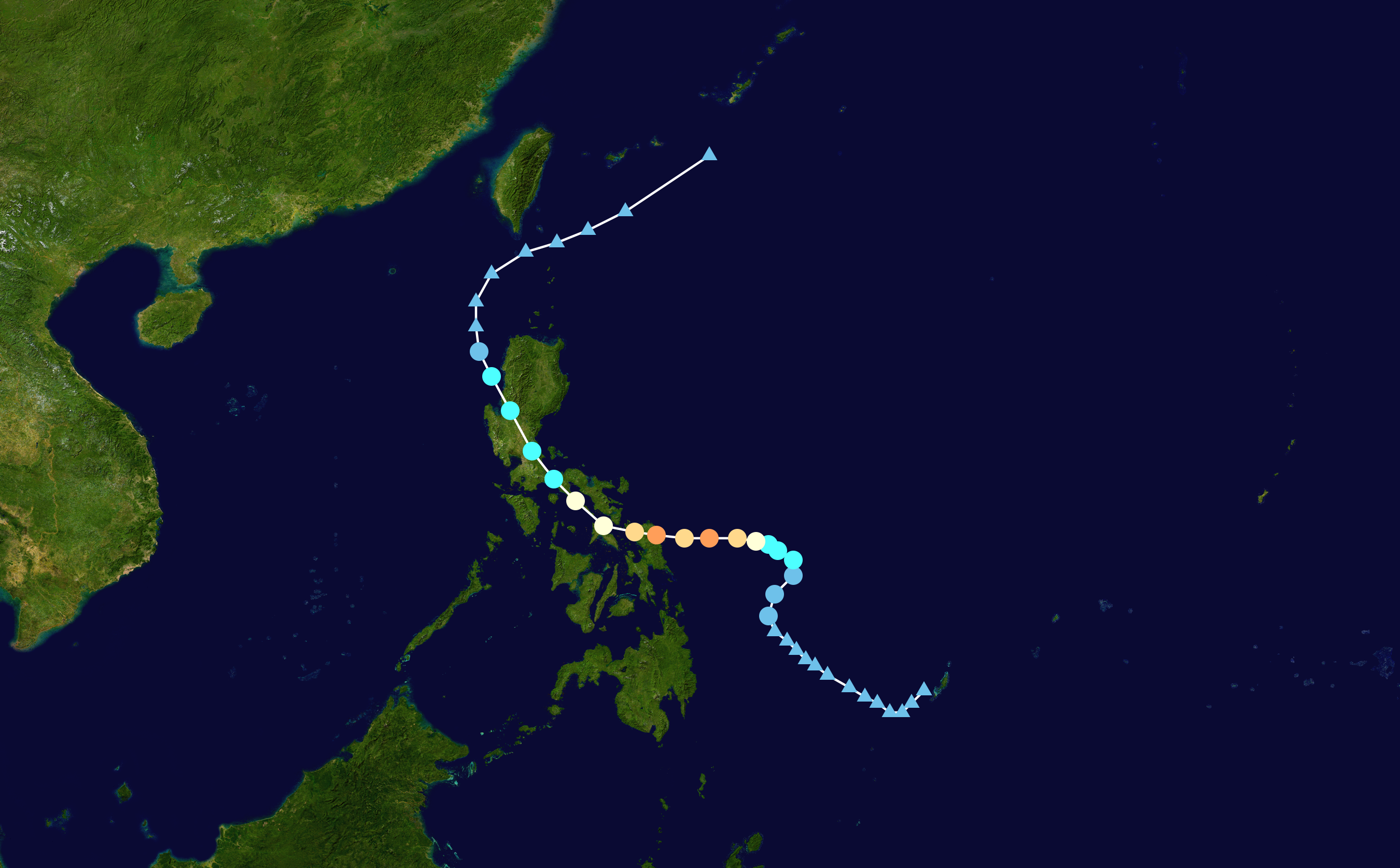
- Duration: May 8 – May 18
- Peak intensity: 155 km/h (100 mph) (10-min); 960 hPa (mbar)

After 4 months of lull activity, A low-pressure area was first noted on May 9 by the JTWC near Micronesia and was given a medium chance of developing into a tropical cyclone. The following day, the JMA declared that it had developed into a tropical depression to the east of Mindanao, Philippines and was expected to slowly move west. On May 10, PAGASA later followed suit and named the depression Ambo.

The system began to slowly drift westwards throughout the following days, and on the next day, the JTWC upgraded Ambo to a tropical depression, designating it as 01W. The JMA upgraded 01W to a tropical storm and assigned it the first name of the year, Vongfong. Shortly after, the JTWC followed and upgraded the system to tropical storm intensity. A well-defined eye soon emerged on microwave satellite imagery as the storm's structure became further organized The eye became increasingly pronounced and contracted to less than 10 km (6.2 mi) in diameter as the storm's evolution became suggestive of rapid intensification. The JTWC assessed 1-minute sustained winds of 195 km/h (121 mph) at 21:00 UTC on May 13 shortly before the onset of an eyewall replacement cycle; Vongfong made landfall with this intensity over San Policarpo, Eastern Samar, at 04:15 UTC on May 14. Vongfong made six additional landfalls as it traversed the remainder of the Visayas into Luzon: Dalupiri Island; Capul Island; Ticao Island; Burias Island; San Andres, Quezon; and Real, Quezon. The prolonged interaction with land caused Vongfong to weaken, though the storm maintained a compact circulation amid otherwise favorable atmospheric conditions. On May 15, Vongfong downgraded back into a tropical storm and later tropical depression on the following day before dissipated over Bashi Channel on May 17.

=== Tropical Storm Nuri (Butchoy) ===
- Tropical storm (JMA)
- Tropical storm (SSHWS)
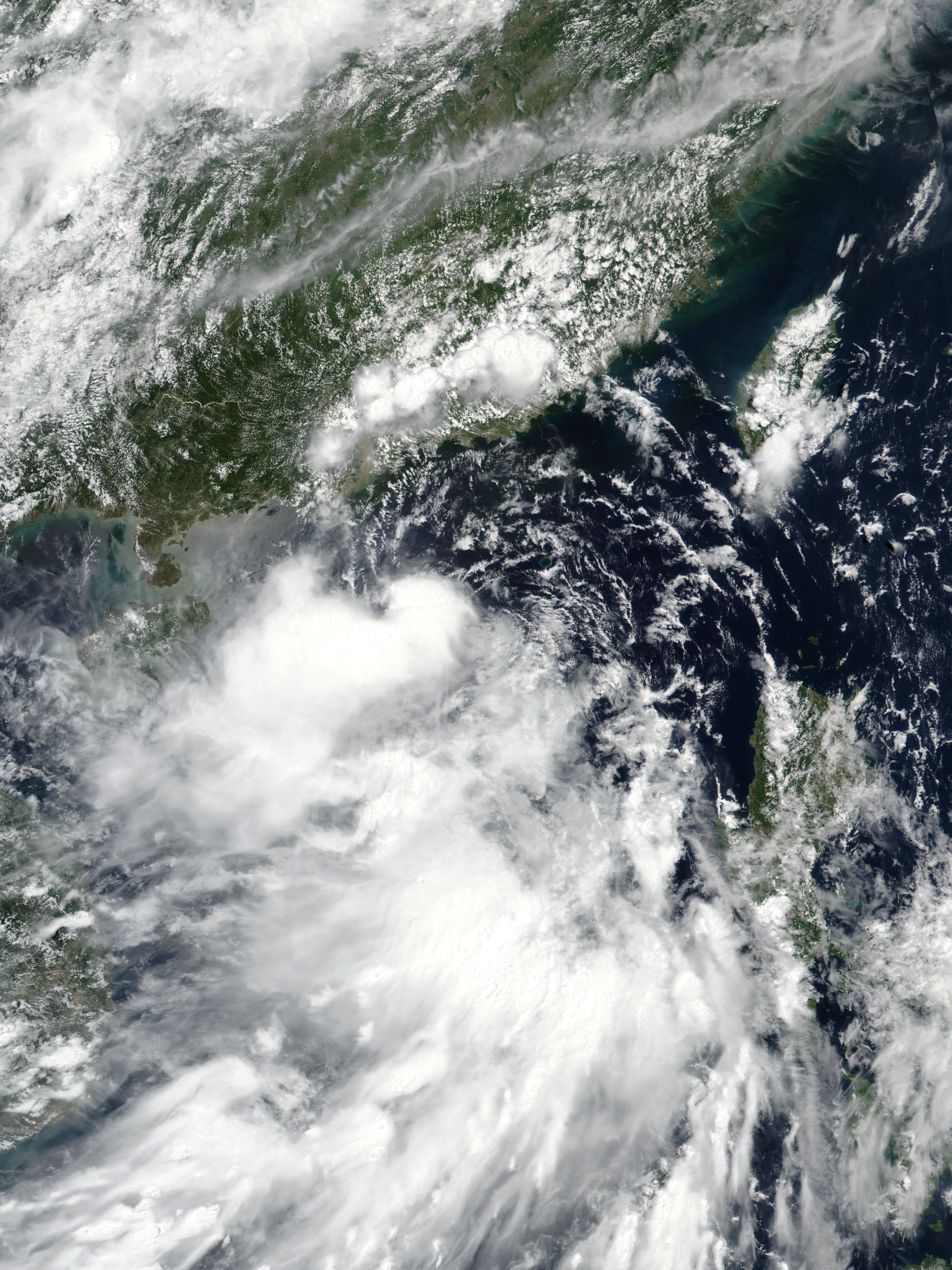
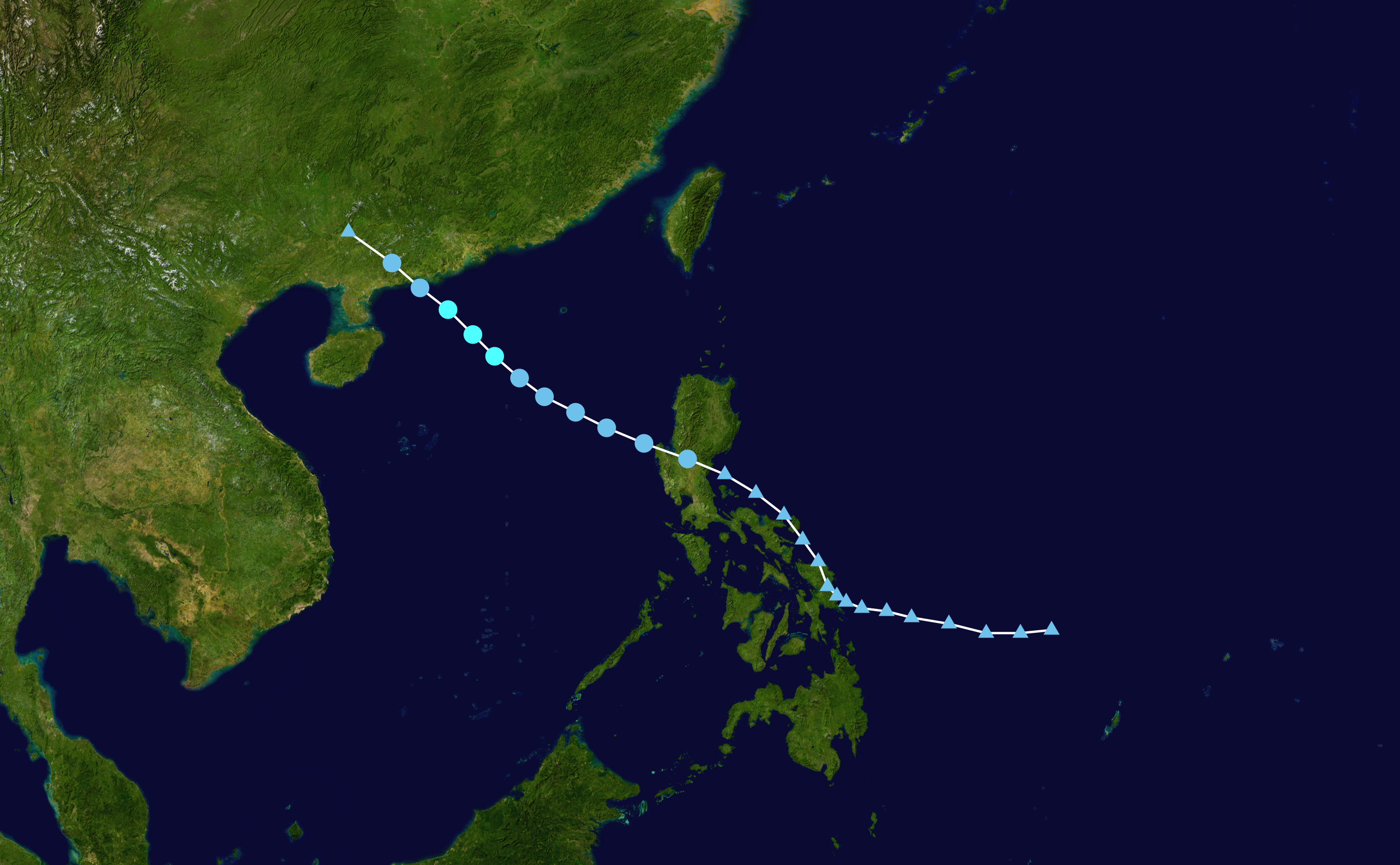
- Duration: June 10 – June 14
- Peak intensity: 75 km/h (45 mph) (10-min); 996 hPa (mbar)

On June 10, the JMA began monitoring on a weak tropical depression that had developed to the east of the Philippine island of Samar in Visayas. During the next day, the PAGASA began tracking the system, giving the local name Butchoy. The storm then made its first landfall in Polillo Island in Quezon at 5:30 pm PHT, and making its second landfall in Infanta, Quezon shortly thereafter. Soon after, the JTWC issued a Tropical Cyclone Formation Alert for the storm. Afterwards, the JTWC officially upgraded Butchoy to a tropical depression, and designated it as 02W. With a favorable environment with low vertical wind shear, moderate equatorial outflow and 30–31 °C sea surface temperatures, Butchoy started to intensify in the South China Sea, becoming a tropical storm and receiving the name Nuri from the JMA later on the same day. Then, PAGASA issued their final warning on Nuri as it exited the Philippine Area of Responsibility. By the next day, Nuri intensified further and subsequently peaked in intensity, with the JMA analyzing the storm's peak winds of 75 kilometers per hour (47 mph). Six hours later, the JTWC upgraded Nuri to a tropical storm. However, later in the same day, the JTWC downgraded Nuri into a tropical depression, citing that the storm has drifted into high vertical wind shear. The JMA followed suit, downgrading Nuri into a depression. The JTWC issued their final warning on Nuri as the storm subsequently made landfall in Yanjiang, China. The JMA followed suit six hours later, issuing their final warning on the system.

The PAGASA issued Tropical Cyclone Signal No. 1 for western Mindanao, southern Luzon, and Visayas on June 11 as Butchoy neared the Philippines. The combination of the system and prevailing southwesterly winds brought showers and thunderstorms across the Philippines. Heavy rainfall in Albay led to the activation of disaster risk management officials and other emergency assets. The rains from the tropical depression prompted PAGASA to declare the start of the rainy season in the Philippines on June 12, 2020, which was also during the country's Independence Day. In Hong Kong, Nuri brought heavy rain. One person also drowned due to rough waters.

=== Tropical Depression Carina ===
- Tropical depression (JMA)
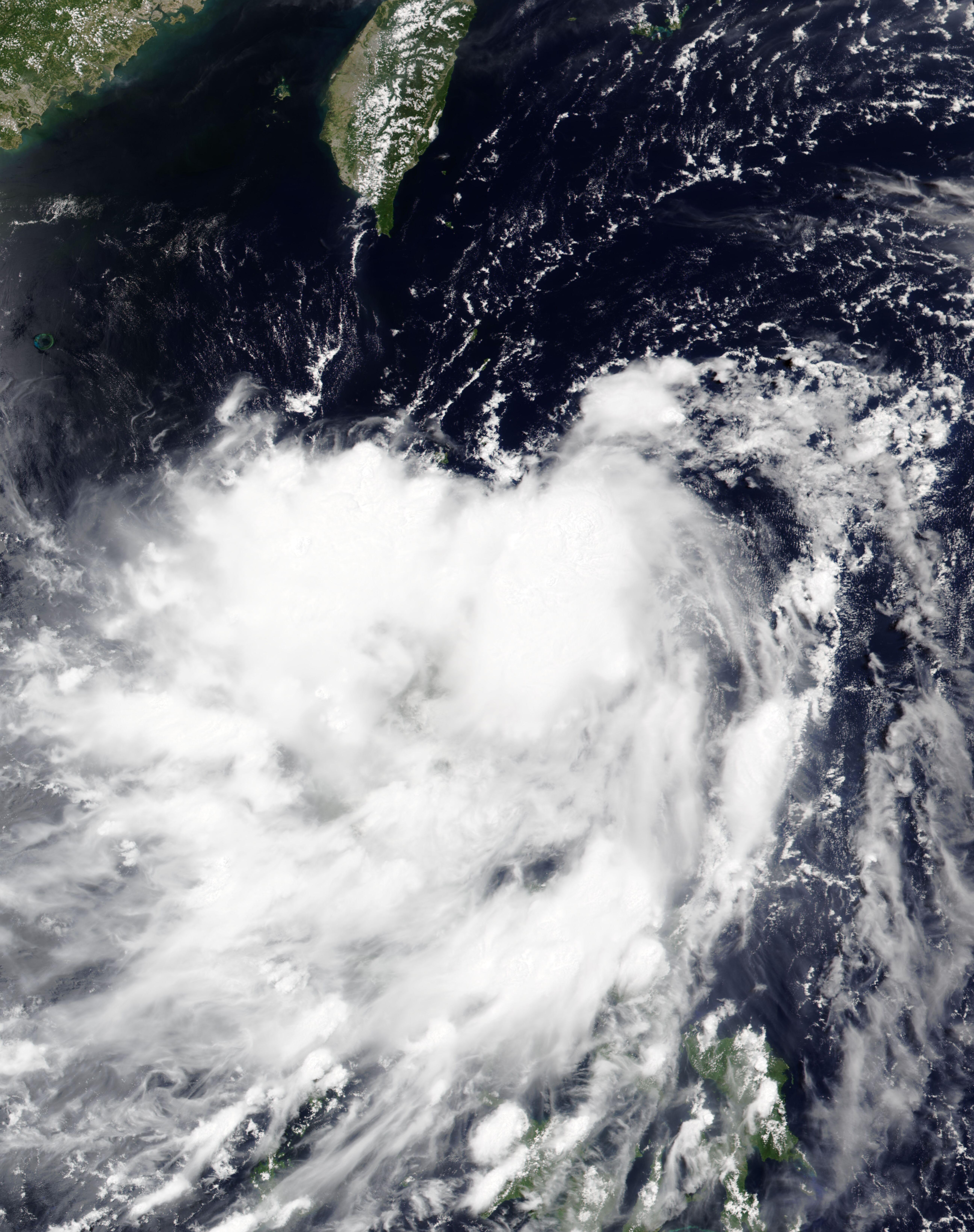
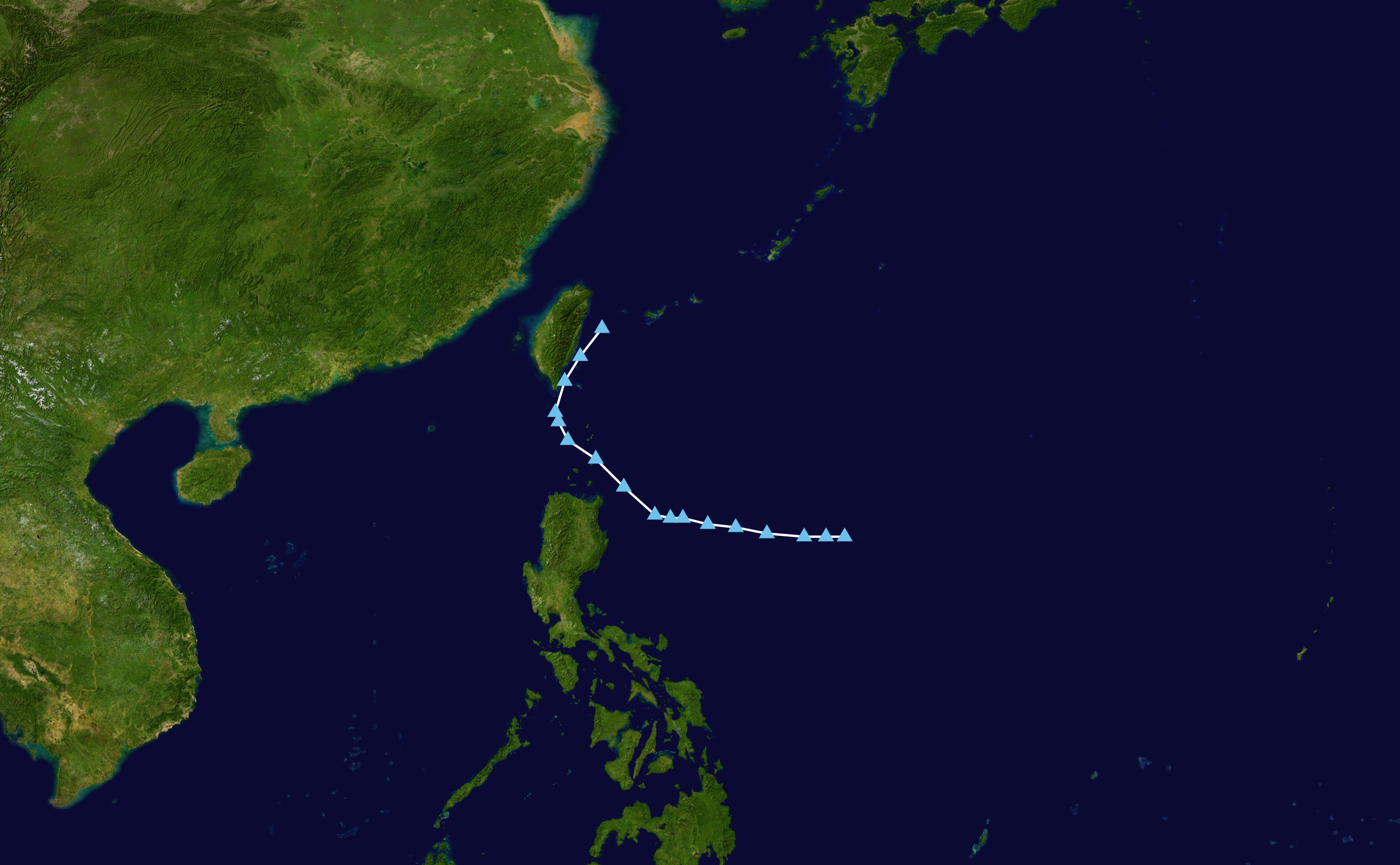
- Duration: July 11 – July 15
- Peak intensity: <55 km/h (35 mph) (10-min); 1004 hPa (mbar)

After about one month of inactivity, on July 11, the JMA designated a low-pressure area near Luzon as a tropical depression. The next day, the JTWC designated the depression as an invest and was given a low chance of developing, and later upgraded to a medium chance. On the following day, the PAGASA upgraded the low-pressure system to a tropical depression and named it Carina.

Carina moved north-northwest over an environment favorable for further development, with low vertical wind shear, established equatorial outflow and 28–29 °C sea surface temperatures. By 12:00 UTC on July 14, Carina rapidly weakened into a low-pressure area, due to an unfavorable environment with strong wind shear. PAGASA then issued their final advisory to Carina, and the remnants dissipated on July 15.

As the low-pressure system was named Carina, PAGASA immediately hoisted Signal #1, the lowest of their storm warning signals, to Batanes, Babuyan Islands and the northeastern portion of Cagayan. Heavy rainfall from Carina caused some damage on Ilocos Norte, Abra and Isabela.

=== Typhoon Hagupit (Dindo) ===
- Typhoon (JMA)
- Category 1 typhoon (SSHWS)
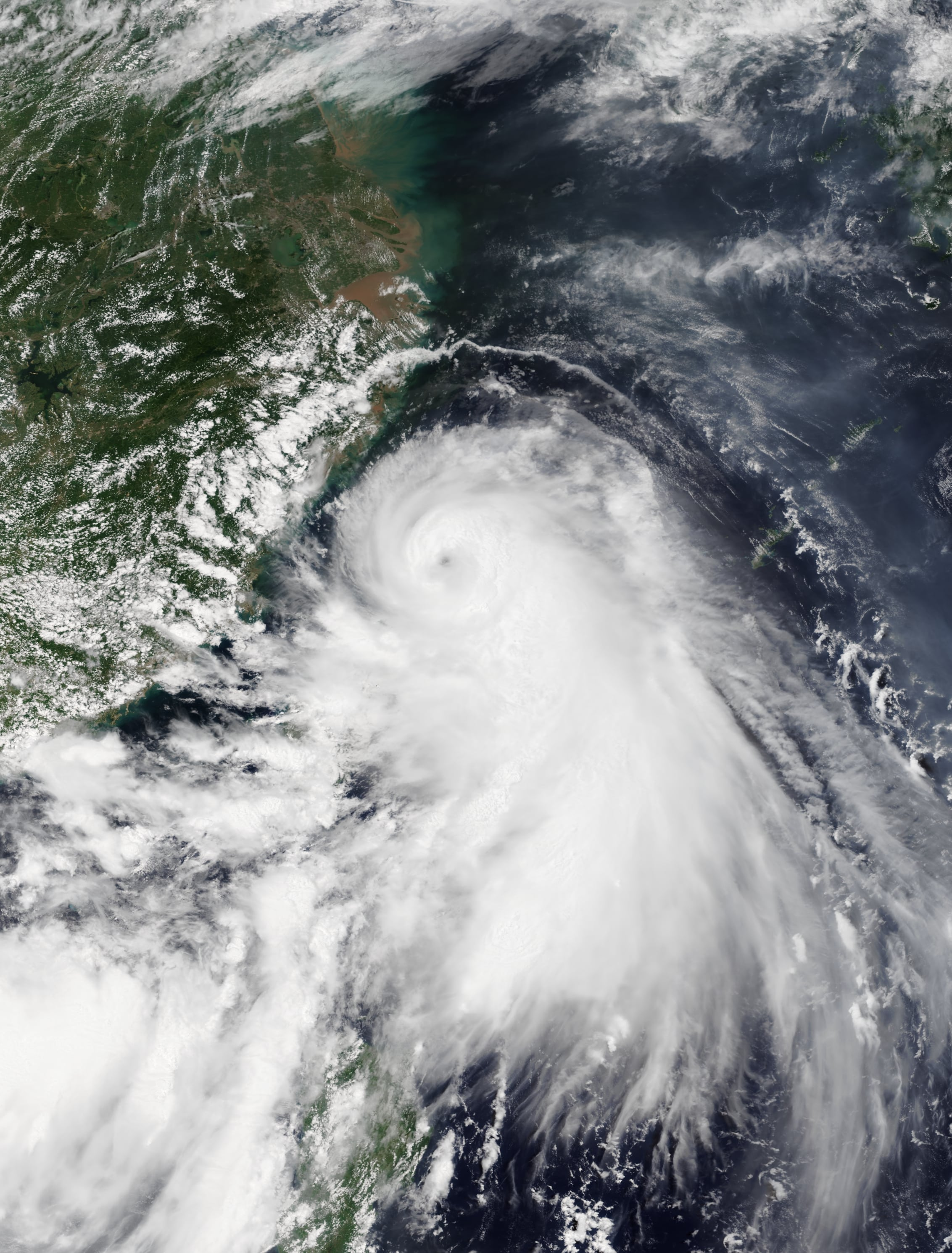
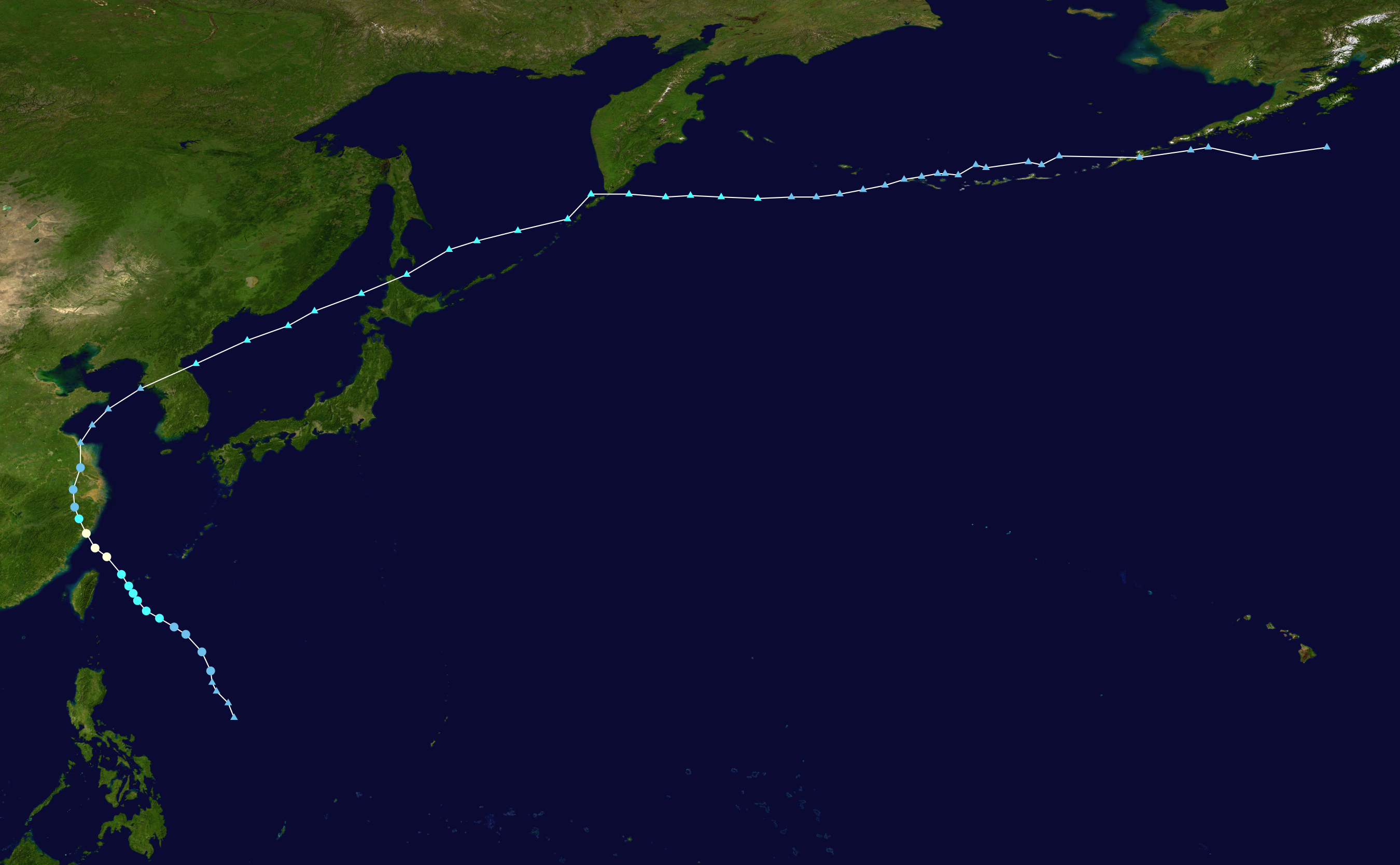
- Duration: July 30 – August 5
- Peak intensity: 130 km/h (80 mph) (10-min); 975 hPa (mbar)

On July 31, JMA began monitoring a weak tropical depression that had developed in the Philippine Sea. Later, PAGASA named Dindo to the storm. By the next day, the Joint Typhoon Warning Center designated Dindo as Tropical Depression 03W. With favorable conditions of low vertical wind shear, strong equatorial outflow and 31 °C sea surface temperatures, Dindo intensified into a tropical storm on midday of the same time, and the Japan Meteorological Agency named it as Hagupit. Hagupit then began intensifying in the Philippine Sea, and by August 2, Hagupit was upgraded into a typhoon by the JTWC. The JMA later upgraded Hagupit to a severe tropical storm late on August 2. As Hagupit exited the Philippine Area of Responsibility (PAR), the PAGASA issued its final bulletin on the system. Hagupit was then upgraded into typhoon status by the JMA on August 3, and will later peak in intensity with a pressure of 975 hPa. At around 19:30 UTC, Hagupit made landfall in Wenzhou, China, with winds of 85 mph and pressure of 975 mbar (hPa). After its landfall, Hagupit gradually weakened over China, and by early August 4, the JTWC downgraded the typhoon into a tropical storm. Around midday of the same day, JTWC downgraded Hagupit into a tropical depression and later issued their final advisories on the storm, but the JMA still monitored Hagupit as a tropical storm. The system later would undergo an extratropical transition, a process which got completed on August 6, and the JMA issued their final advisory on the extratropical Hagupit.

In advance of Hagupit, Chinese officials ordered the evacuation of areas vulnerable to flooding. Hagupit caused torrential rainfall over portions of China peaking at 13.11 inches (333 mm) in the Jingshan district of Wenzhou. 15 people were reported dead across South Korea, 6 of them following a landslide in South Chungcheong Province, 11 people were reported missing, and 7 people were injured.

=== Tropical Storm Sinlaku ===
- Tropical storm (JMA)
- Tropical storm (SSHWS)
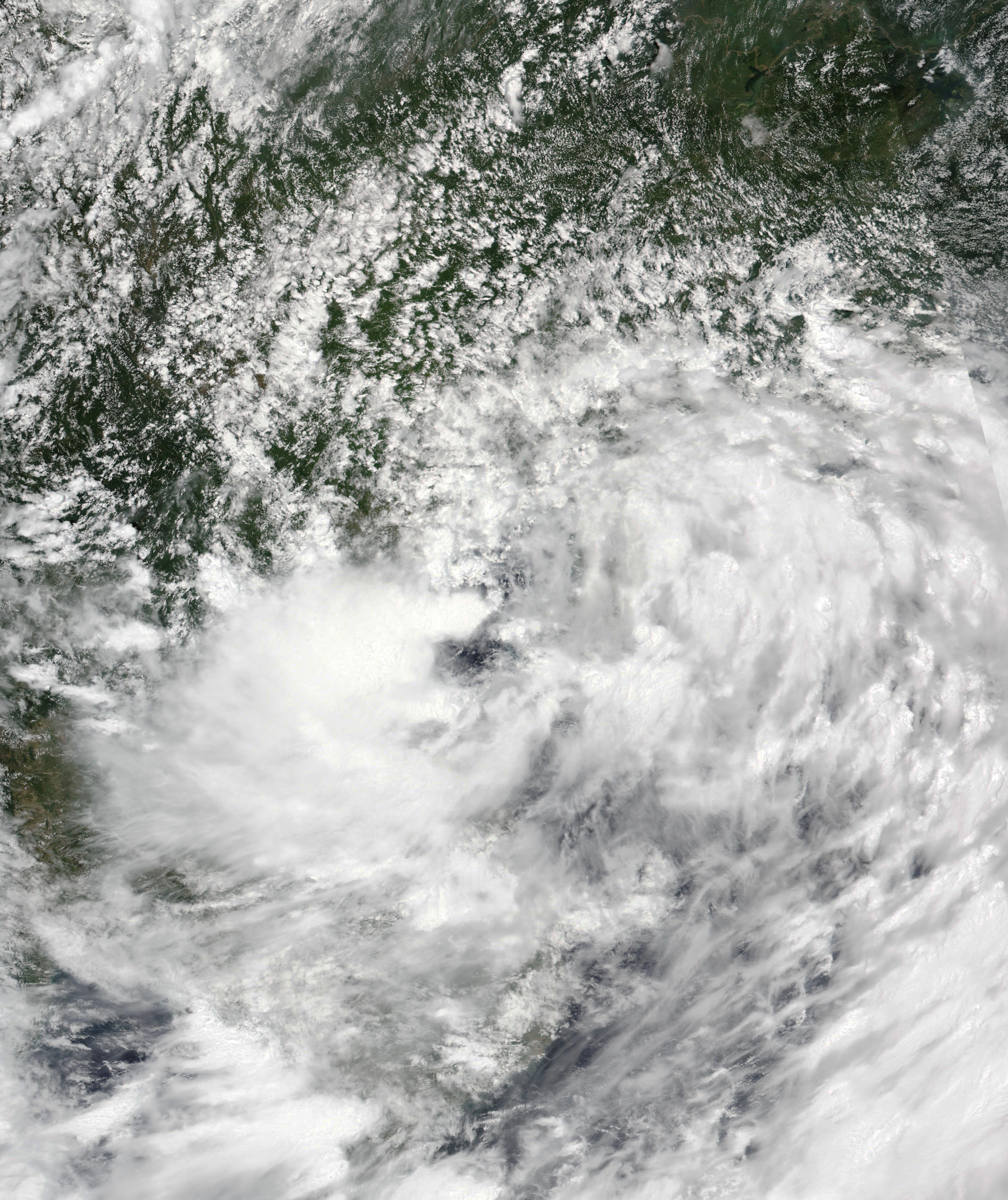
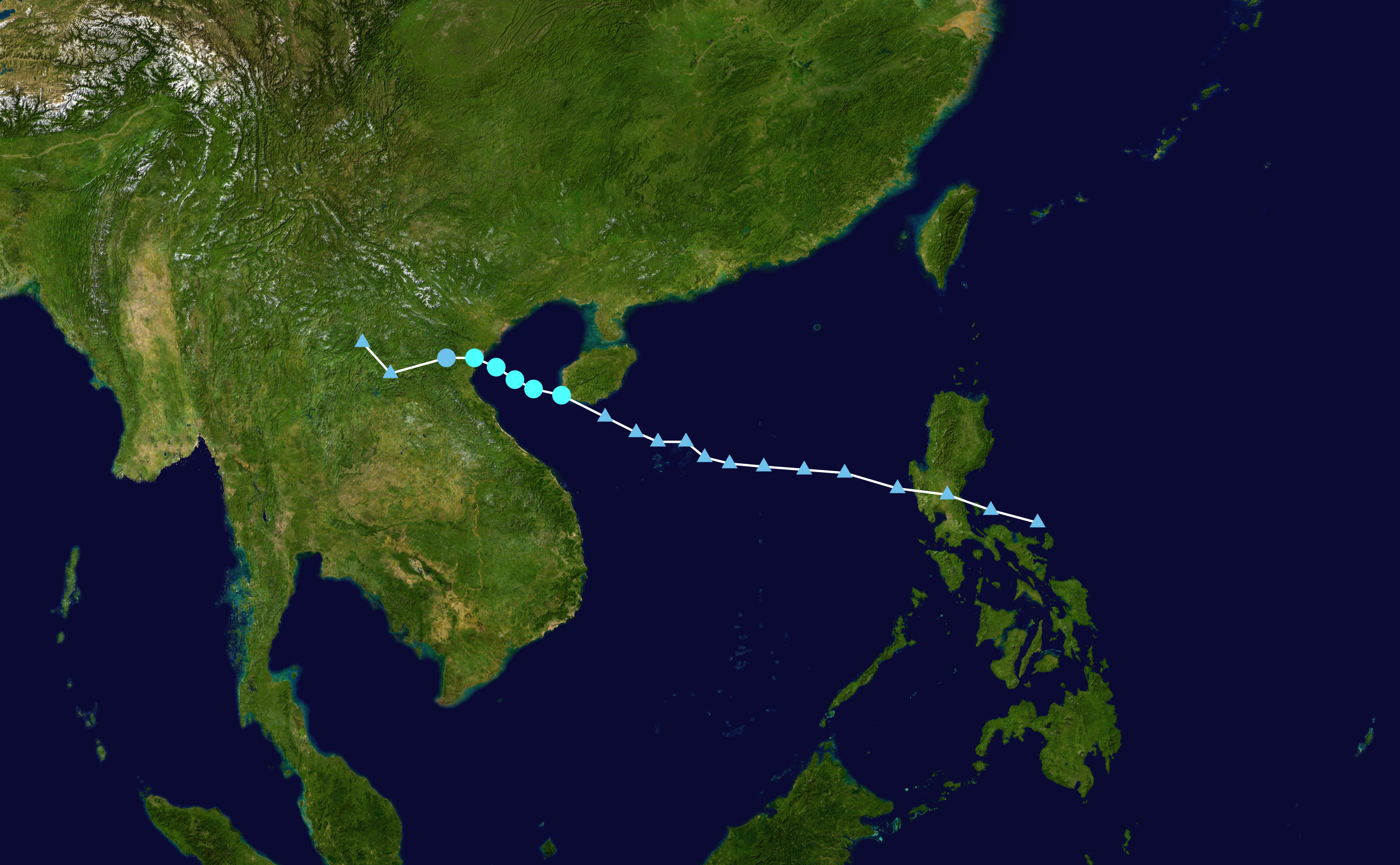
- Duration: July 31 – August 3
- Peak intensity: 75 km/h (45 mph) (10-min); 985 hPa (mbar)

On July 29, a tropical disturbance formed and was situated a couple hundred miles east of Manila, Philippines. Struggling to consolidate, the disturbance crossed Luzon with little to no organization and began organizing in the South China Sea. Environmental conditions became conducive for development, and the JMA declared that a tropical depression had formed in the early hours of July 31. Then early on August 1, the depression intensified into Tropical Storm Sinlaku. The storm failed to intensify much afterward, and during the following day, Sinlaku made landfall on northern Vietnam. Shortly thereafter, both agencies issued final advisories on the storm.

Sinlaku produced heavy rain across central and northern Vietnam, resulting in significant flooding. Two people died, one from a collapsed embankment and the other from flash flooding. Thousands of homes were inundated and crops suffered extensive damage. Damage in the nation was about nearly 5.4 billion đồng (US$232,900). Flash floods across Thailand also killed two people.

The remnants of Sinlaku emerged in the Indian Ocean and intensified into a well marked low-pressure area between August 5–8, recreating a lot of torrential rain in portions of India.

=== Tropical Storm Jangmi (Enteng) ===
- Tropical storm (JMA)
- Tropical storm (SSHWS)
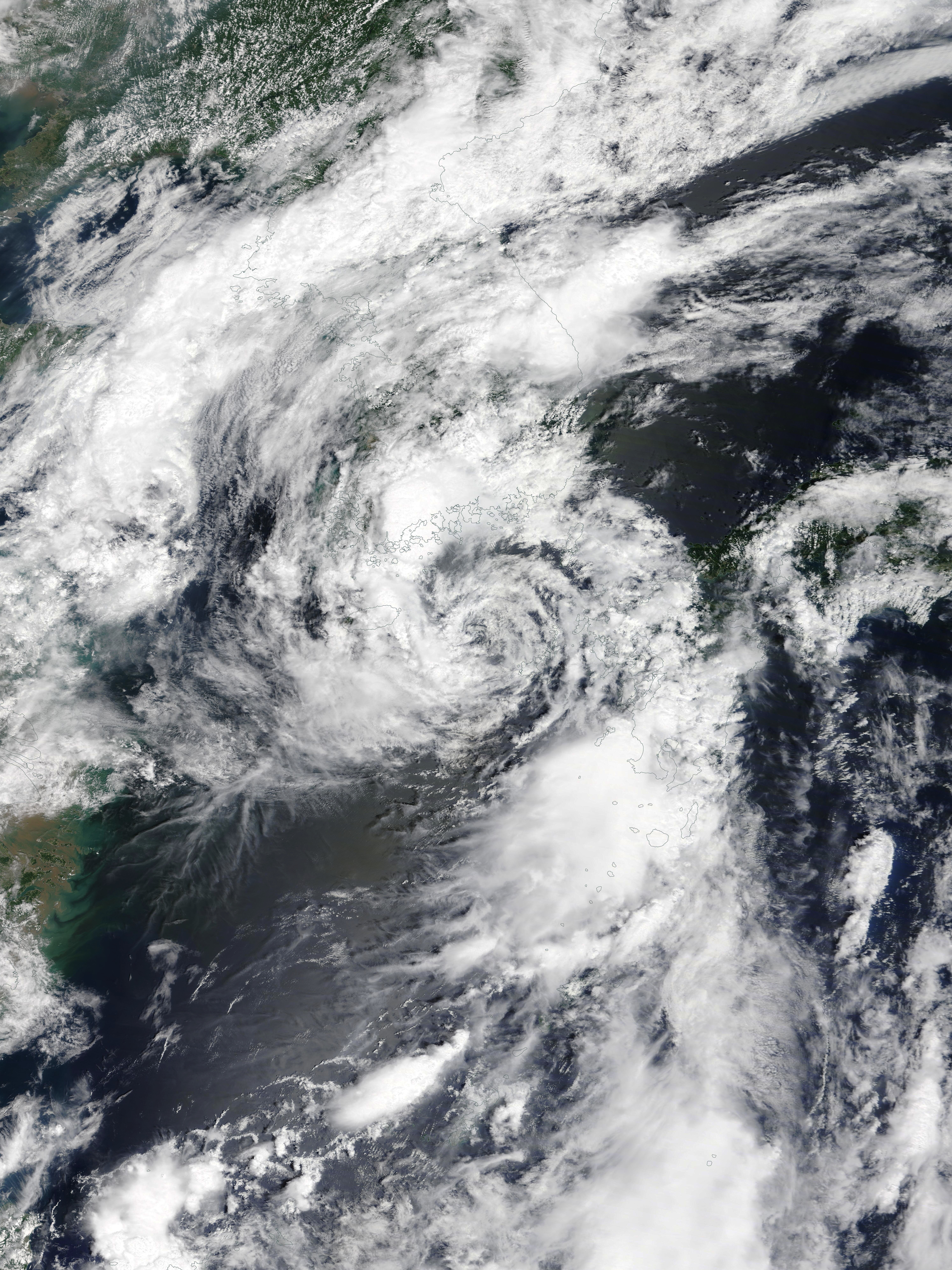
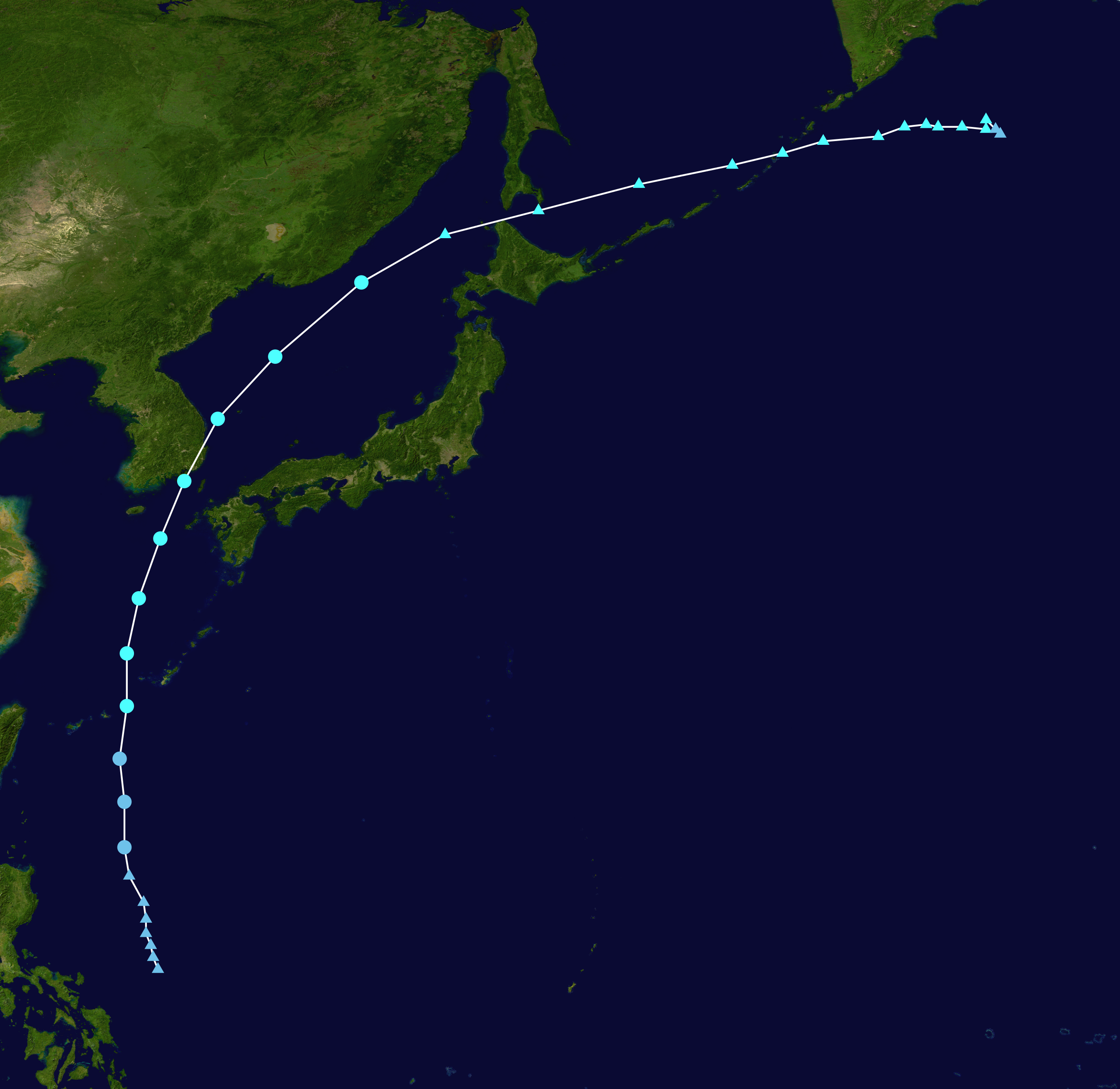
- Duration: August 6 – August 11
- Peak intensity: 85 km/h (50 mph) (10-min); 994 hPa (mbar)

On August 6, the Philippine Atmospheric, Geophysical and Astronomical Services Administration started to monitor a low-pressure area that developed well east of Virac, Catanduanes. On the next day, the Japan Meteorological Agency designated the low-pressure area as a weak tropical depression. Despite a broad and elongated low-level circulation center, it gradually organized, prompting the Joint Typhoon Warning Center to issue a Tropical Cyclone Formation Alert on the depression.

Early on next day, the PAGASA upgraded it to a depression, naming it Enteng. Later around the same day, the JTWC designated the depression as 05W. But, near end on the same day, the Japan Meteorological Agency upgraded the depression to a tropical storm, receiving the name Jangmi. As such, Jangmi became the fifth named tropical storm of the 2020 typhoon season. On August 9, Jangmi was upgraded into a tropical storm by the JTWC. Despite being at favorable conditions of low vertical shear and 29–30 °C sea surface temperatures, an upper-level low present to the west of the system prohibited the broad Jangmi to organize further. Around the same time, the PAGASA dropped advisories on Jangmi as it quickly exited the Philippine Area of Responsibility. Moving northward at 23 knots, the JMA reported that Jangmi already peaked at 45 knots (52 mph; 83 km/h). Around 05:50 UTC on August 10, Jangmi made landfall on the southern tip of Geojedo, Gyeongsang Province in South Korea. The JTWC issued their final advisories on Jangmi around 15:00 UTC of the same day, and the JMA issued their final advisory early on the next day, August 11.

Jangmi dropped drenching rainfall through the Ryukyu Islands of Japan, with a peak amount of 2.2 inches (56 mm) recorded on the island of Kumejima. In South Korea, Jangmi dropped up to 2.6 inches (66 mm) of precipitation, in an area already hard hit by flooding in the months previous to Jangmi.

=== Tropical Depression 06W (Gener) ===
- Tropical depression (JMA)
- Tropical storm (SSHWS)
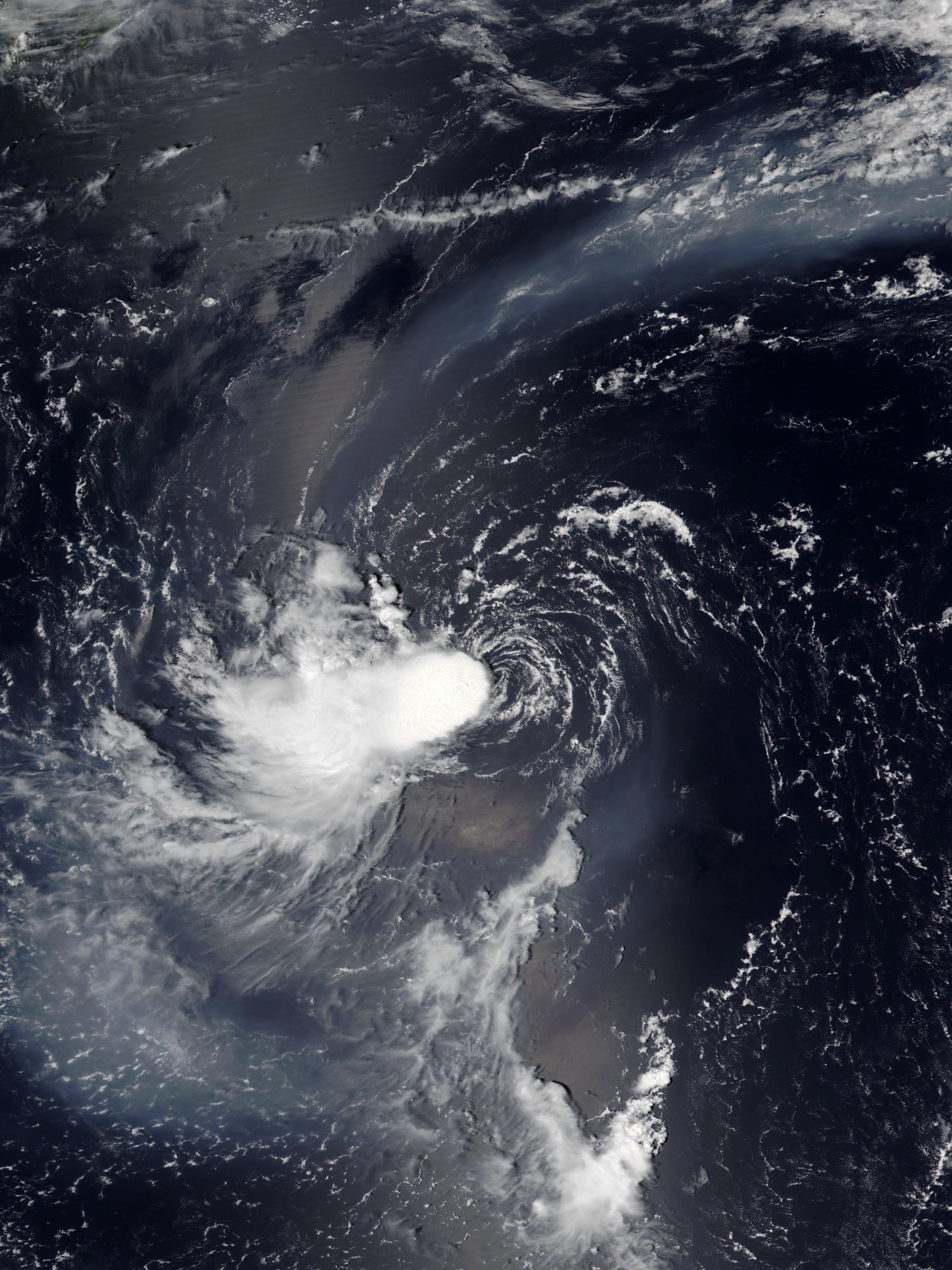
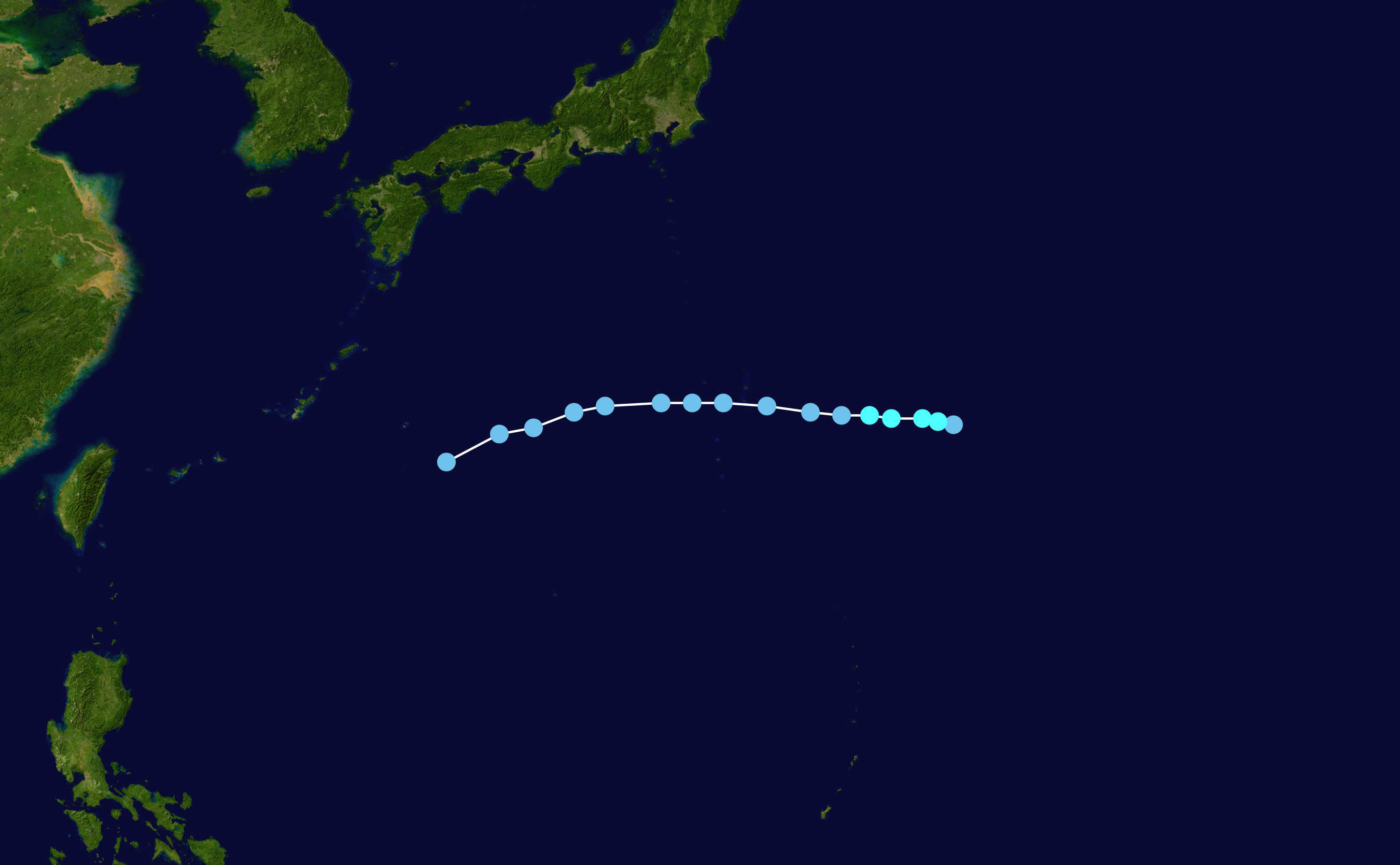
- Duration: August 8 – August 13
- Peak intensity: 55 km/h (35 mph) (10-min); 1012 hPa (mbar)

A hybrid system formed on August 7, to the south of Japan. It slowly moved westwards, and on August 9, it transitioned into a tropical cyclone.

Due to the fact that the disturbance already had tropical-storm-force winds, it was immediately declared a tropical storm by the JTWC on August 9. The next day, the tropical depression reached its peak intensity of 35 mph with an unusually high pressure of 1012 mbar. Soon afterwards 06W began to gradually weaken, and at 15:00 UTC on August 10, the JTWC downgraded 06W to a tropical depression.

Tropical Depression 06W then ceased to be monitored by the JMA on August 12 due to collapses in the convective activity, dry upper-level air intake, and other factors and ending its official monitoring, yet the JTWC still continued to issue updates normally for 06W even though the system had little signs of activity.

After moving generally westward, the system began to move to the southwest and, at 20:00 UTC (4:00 am, August 13 PST), it entered the Philippine's area of responsibility and was given the name Gener by PAGASA. At 03:00 UTC on August 13, the JTWC issued its final warning on 06W, ending the monitoring of agency and global agencies.

=== Severe Tropical Storm Mekkhala (Ferdie) ===
- Severe tropical storm (JMA)
- Category 1 typhoon (SSHWS)
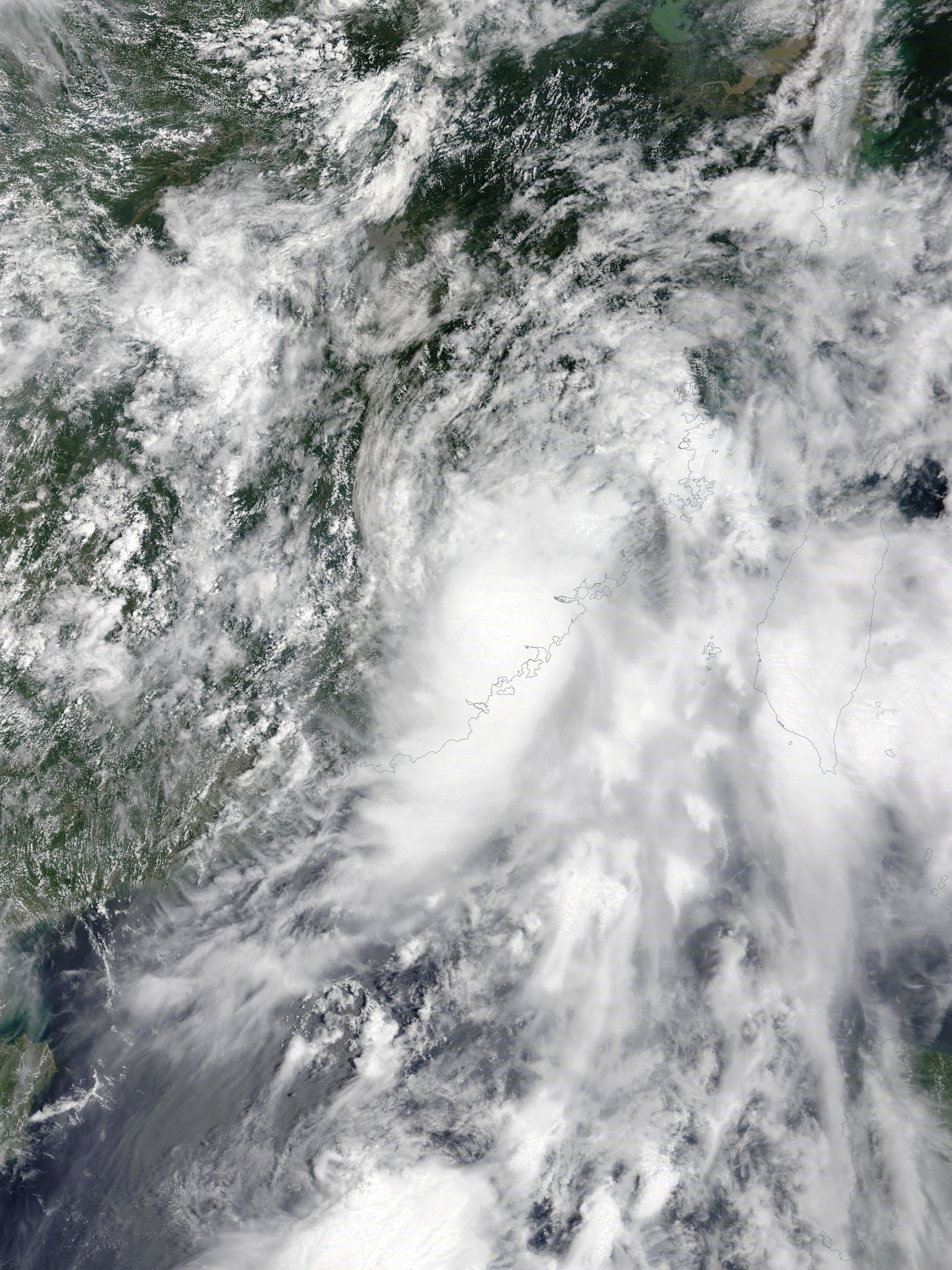
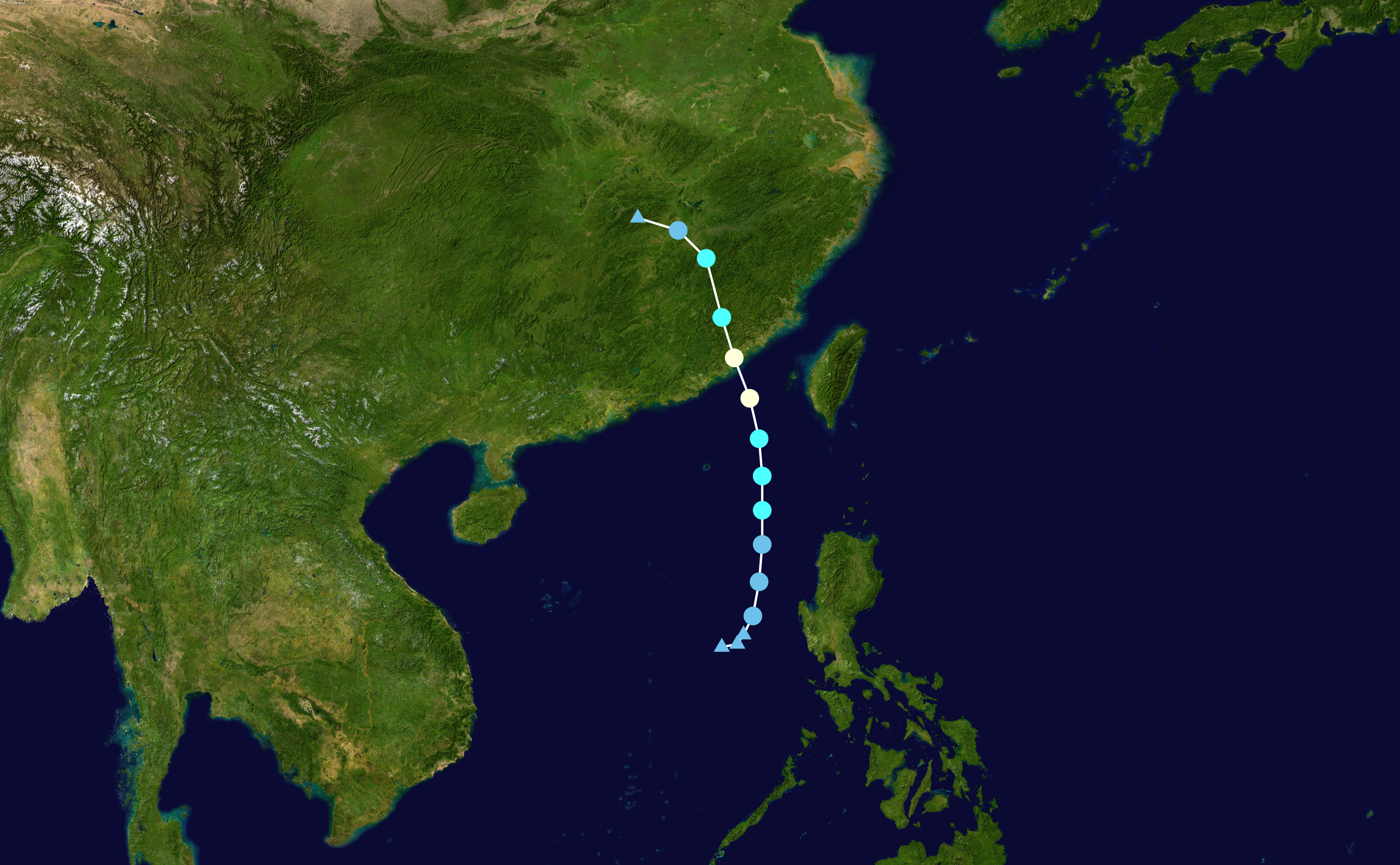
- Duration: August 9 – August 11
- Peak intensity: 95 km/h (60 mph) (10-min); 992 hPa (mbar)

Another area of persistent convection formed within the proximity of the trough that would also spawn Tropical Storm Jangmi On August 7, west of Luzon. As Jangmi became the dominant system in the area, this low-pressure area remained disorganized. However, on the next day, as Jangmi moved away from the area, the system began to organize, and on August 9, the JTWC upgraded the storm to a Tropical Depression. Soon after, at 8:00 pm. PST, the PAGASA followed and upgraded the storm and gave it the name Ferdie. By the next day, the JTWC upgraded Ferdie into a tropical storm. The PAGASA then issued its last warning as Ferdie exited the Philippine Area of Responsibility. Then soon, the JMA followed suit and upgraded Ferdie to a tropical storm, giving it the international name Mekkhala. At 07:30 CST on August 11 (23:30 UTC on August 10), Mekkhala made landfall at Zhangpu County in Fujian, China shortly after peak intensity.

Mekkhala forced a Signal No. 1 warning to be placed for the Ilocos region in the Philippines. Mekkhala brought monsoonal conditions to portions of Luzon, shortly after its formation. Although remain well offshore Taiwan, the storm still brought heavy rainfall to the island.

In China, local officials suspended ferry services and told ships to return to port, in preparation for Mekkhala. The China Meteorological Administration issued a Level III emergency response, while flood control workers were sent to areas which were hit by Mekkhala. Mekkhala dropped torrential rainfall over China with amounts of up to 7.874 inches (200.0 mm) reported in some areas. Train services were halted and flights were canceled at local airports as Mekkhala moved onshore. In Zhangzhou, Fujian, damage from the storm reached 1.1 billion yuan (US$159 million).

=== Severe Tropical Storm Higos (Helen) ===
- Severe tropical storm (JMA)
- Tropical storm (SSHWS)
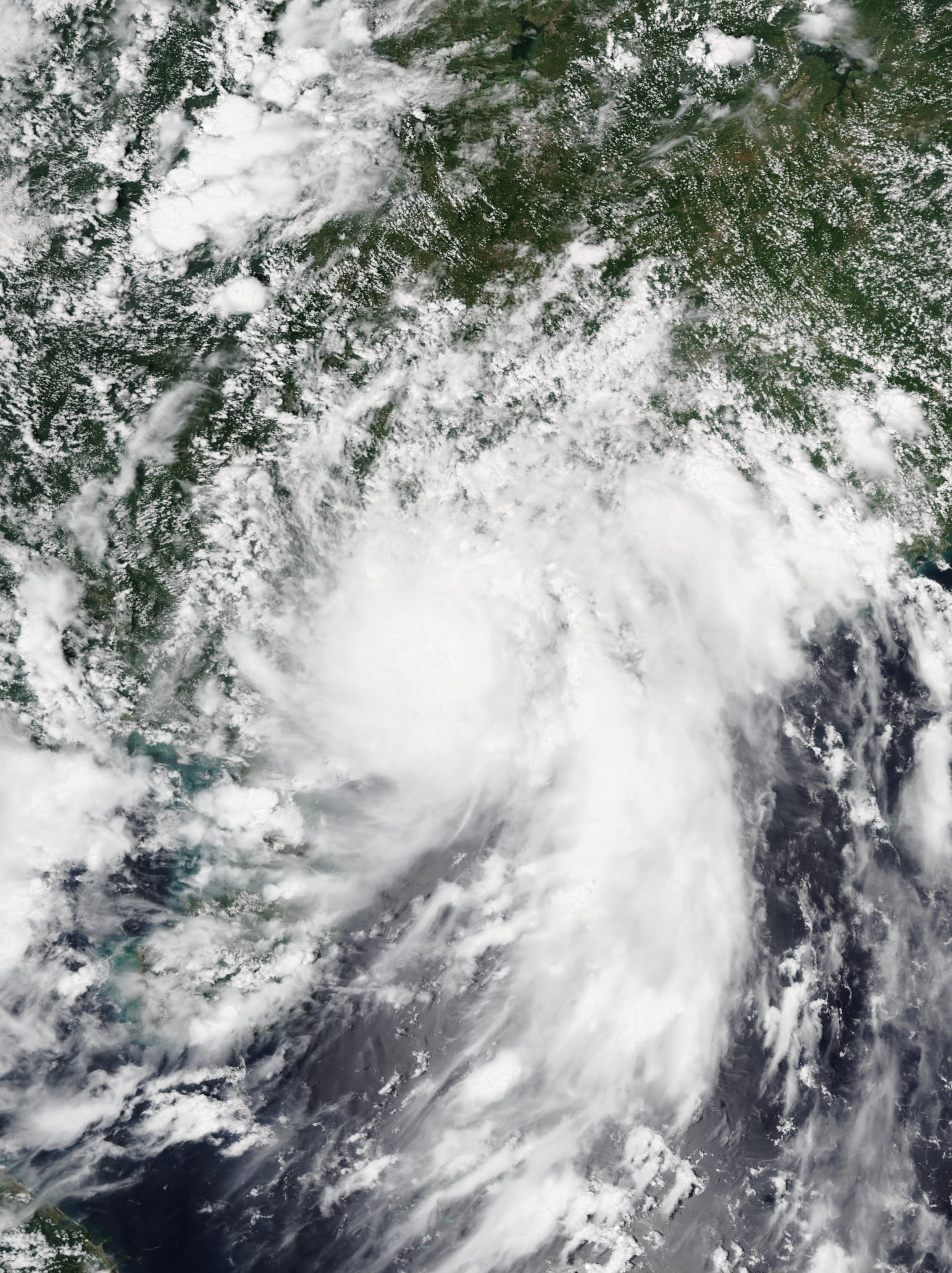
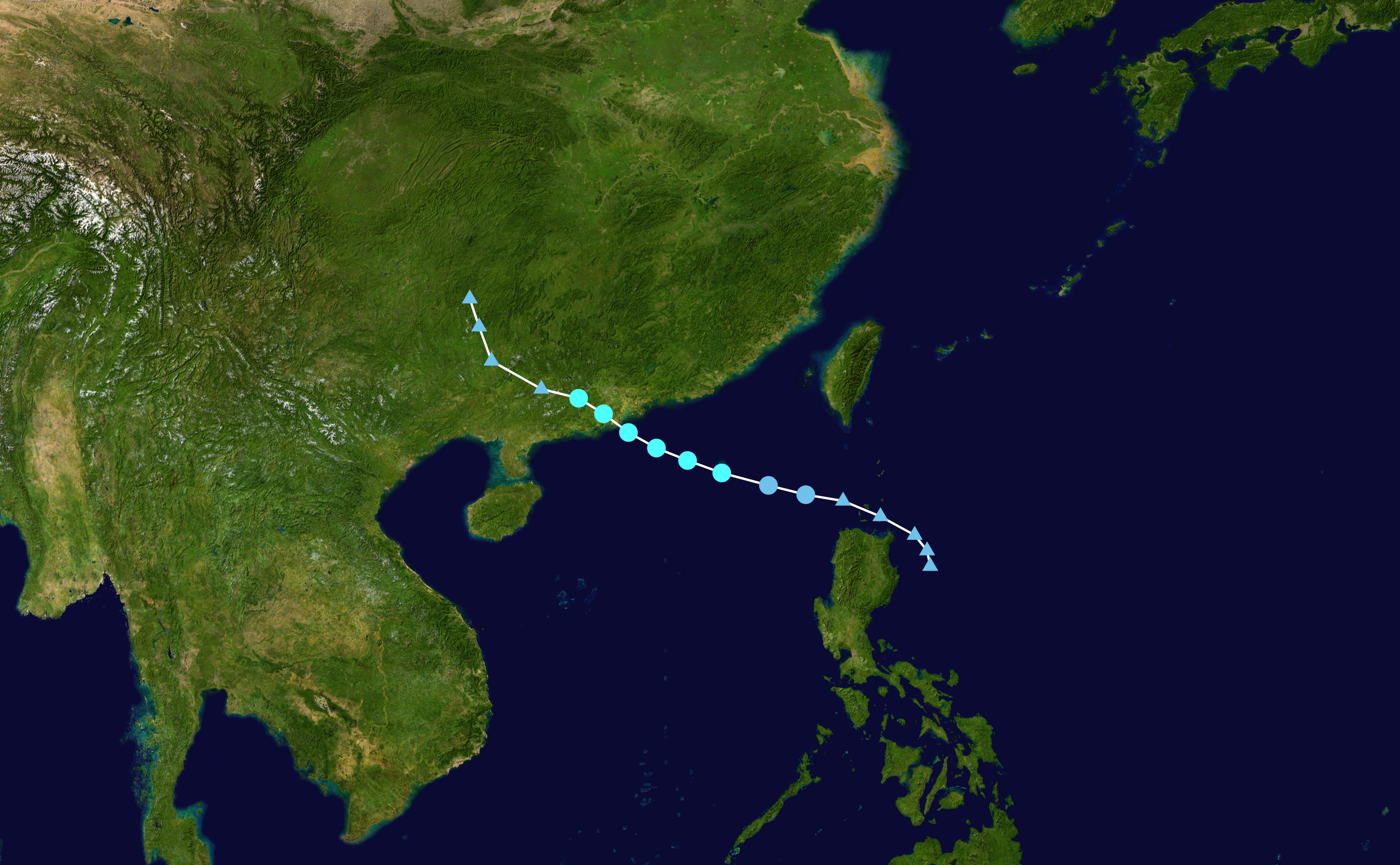
- Duration: August 16 – August 20
- Peak intensity: 100 km/h (65 mph) (10-min); 992 hPa (mbar)

A new tropical depression formed from the Intertropical Convergence Zone east of Luzon on August 16. At 15:00 UTC, the PAGASA named the system Helen and began issuing severe weather bulletins for the tropical depression, but dropped the alerts as Helen left the Philippine area of responsibility after 4 hours. By the next day, Helen intensified into a tropical storm, being given the name Higos by the JMA. Later in the day, the Joint Typhoon Warning Center also upgraded Higos into a tropical storm. JMA eventually upgraded the system to a severe tropical storm by evening that day. The Hong Kong Observatory and Macau Meteorological and Geophysical Bureau upgraded Higos into a marginal typhoon prior to landfall, with sustained hurricane-force winds in Macau indicating such an intensity. Higos made landfall over Zhuhai, Guangdong at peak intensity at around 06:00 CST on August 19 (22:00 UTC on August 18).

In preparation for Higos, the Hong Kong Observatory raised the number 9 tropical cyclone warning signal in Hong Kong to warn of the possibility of hurricane-force winds. Winds generally reached gale to storm force over the southern part of Hong Kong under the influence of Higos' small circulation. The Macao Meteorological and Geophysical Bureau issued the number 10 signal, the highest signal, at 05:00 am local time. Over 65,000 people evacuated and schools were closed across these areas. Although heavily populated areas of China were directly hit by Higos, damage was mostly limited to downed trees and power outages. Two campers who were unaware of the approaching storm had to be rescued from Tap Mun Island after arriving on August 14. The storm also left 7 deaths and 45 billion đồng (US$2 million) in damages in Vietnam.

=== Typhoon Bavi (Igme) ===
- Very strong typhoon (JMA)
- Category 3 typhoon (SSHWS)
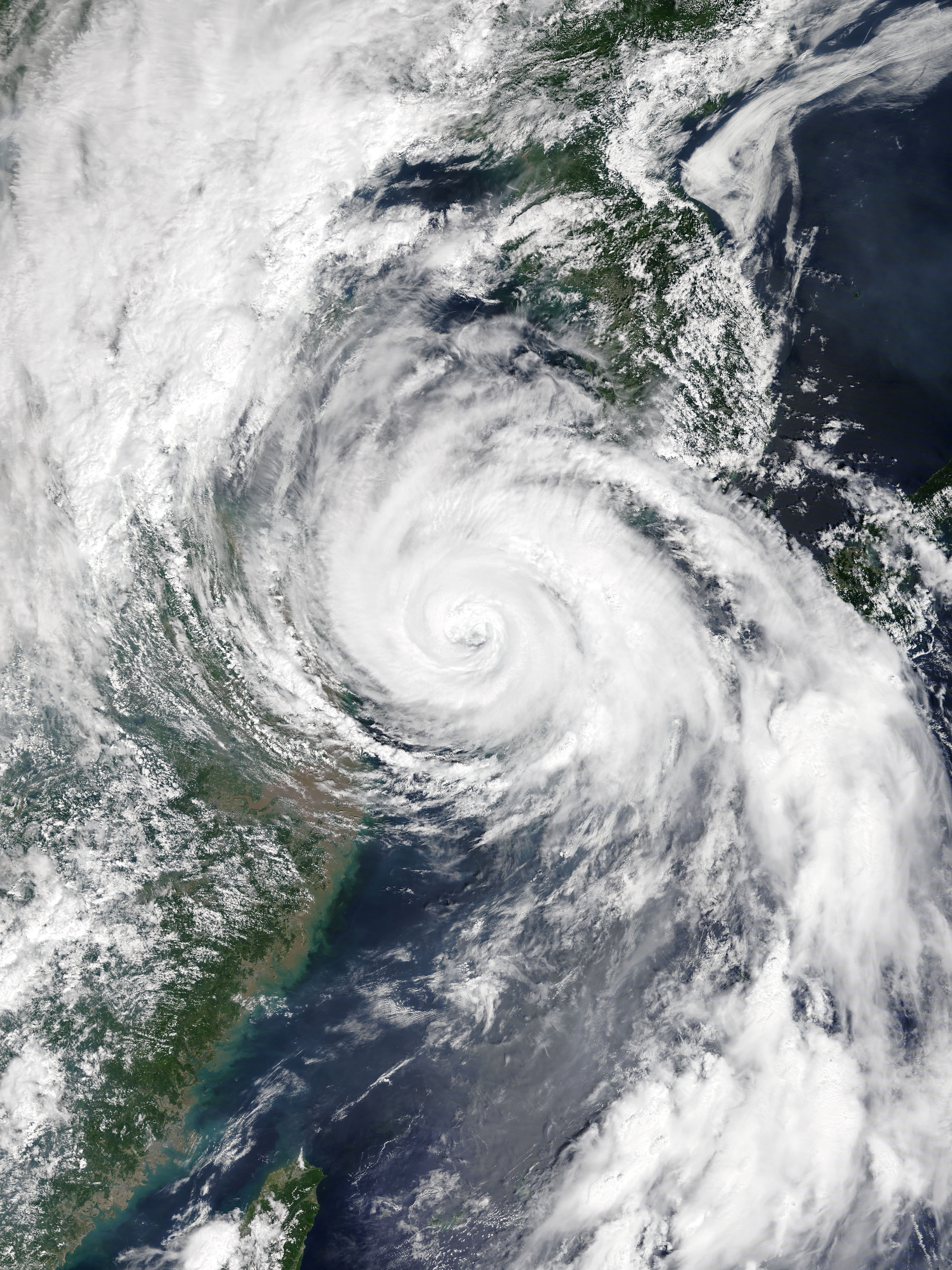
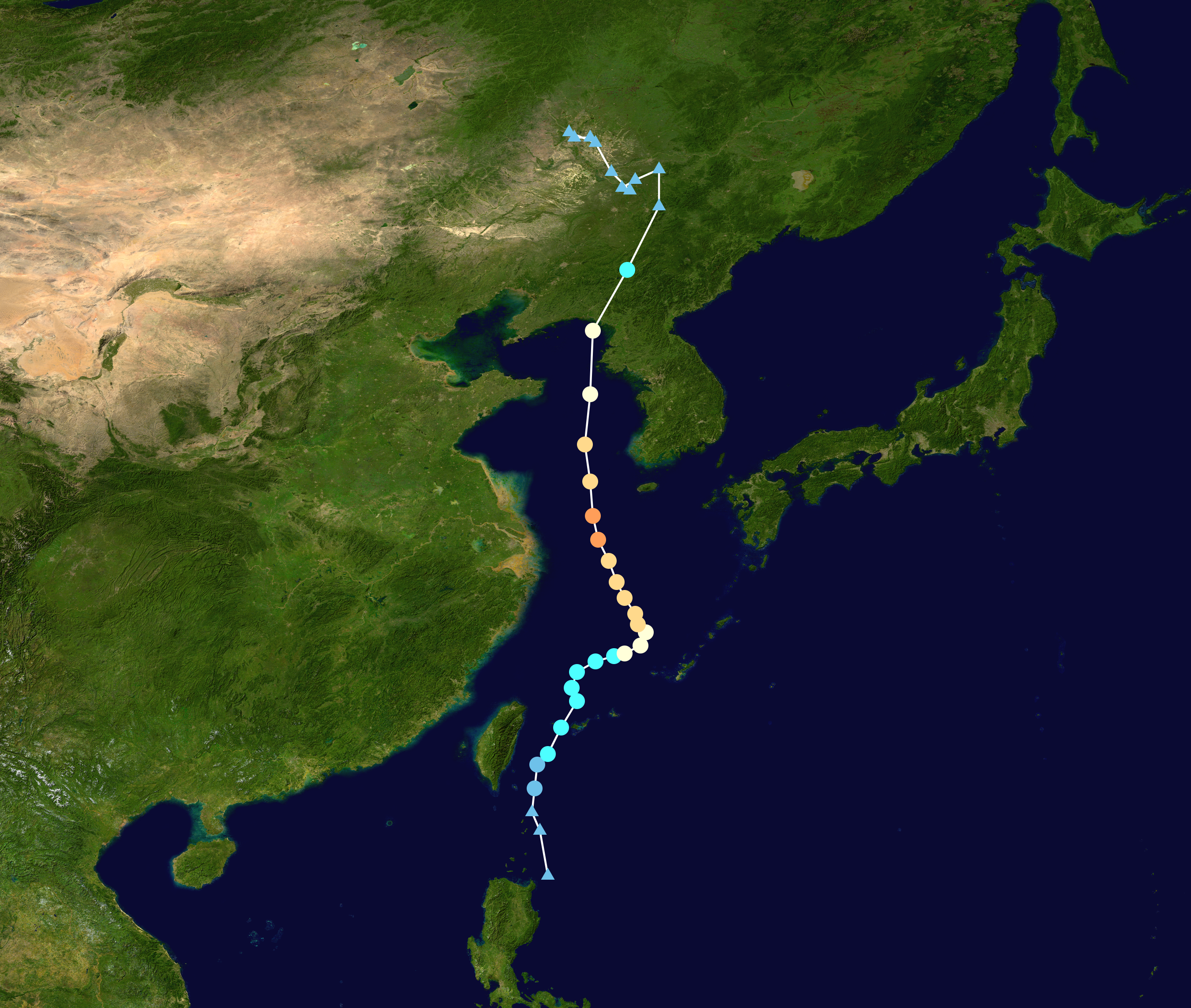
- Duration: August 20 – August 27
- Peak intensity: 155 km/h (100 mph) (10-min); 950 hPa (mbar)

On August 19, the JTWC began monitoring a broad area of low pressure situated a couple hundred miles northeast of the Philippine archipelago. By the next day, the system rapidly organized, and the JTWC subsequently issued a Tropical Cyclone Formation Alert (TCFA). On August 21, the area of low pressure became Tropical Depression 09W. At 15:00 UTC, the PAGASA named the system Igme and issued a severe weather bulletin for it. By the next day, Igme intensified into a tropical storm, according to the JMA and was given the name Bavi, subsequently prompting the JTWC to follow suit and upgrade 09W from a tropical depression to a tropical storm. Favorable conditions allowed Bavi to rapidly intensify, and by 12:00 UTC on August 22, the system became a severe tropical storm. As the system left the Philippine Area of Responsibility, the PAGASA stopped issuing weather bulletins for the severe tropical storm. Bavi's period of rapid intensification was brief, and it began a slow intensification phase on August 23.

On August 24, Bavi slowly intensified, and it was later upgraded by the JMA into a typhoon. Later on that day, it became a Category 2-equivalent typhoon. By the next day, Bavi intensified even more to become a Category 3-equivalent typhoon. As Bavi moved closer to the Korean peninsula, one person died in Jeju island on August 25. At around 00:30 UTC on August 27, Bavi made landfall over North Pyongan Province, North Korea. After that, Typhoon Bavi transitioned into an extratropical storm in Manchuria, China.

=== Typhoon Maysak (Julian) ===
- Very strong typhoon (JMA)
- Category 4 typhoon (SSHWS)
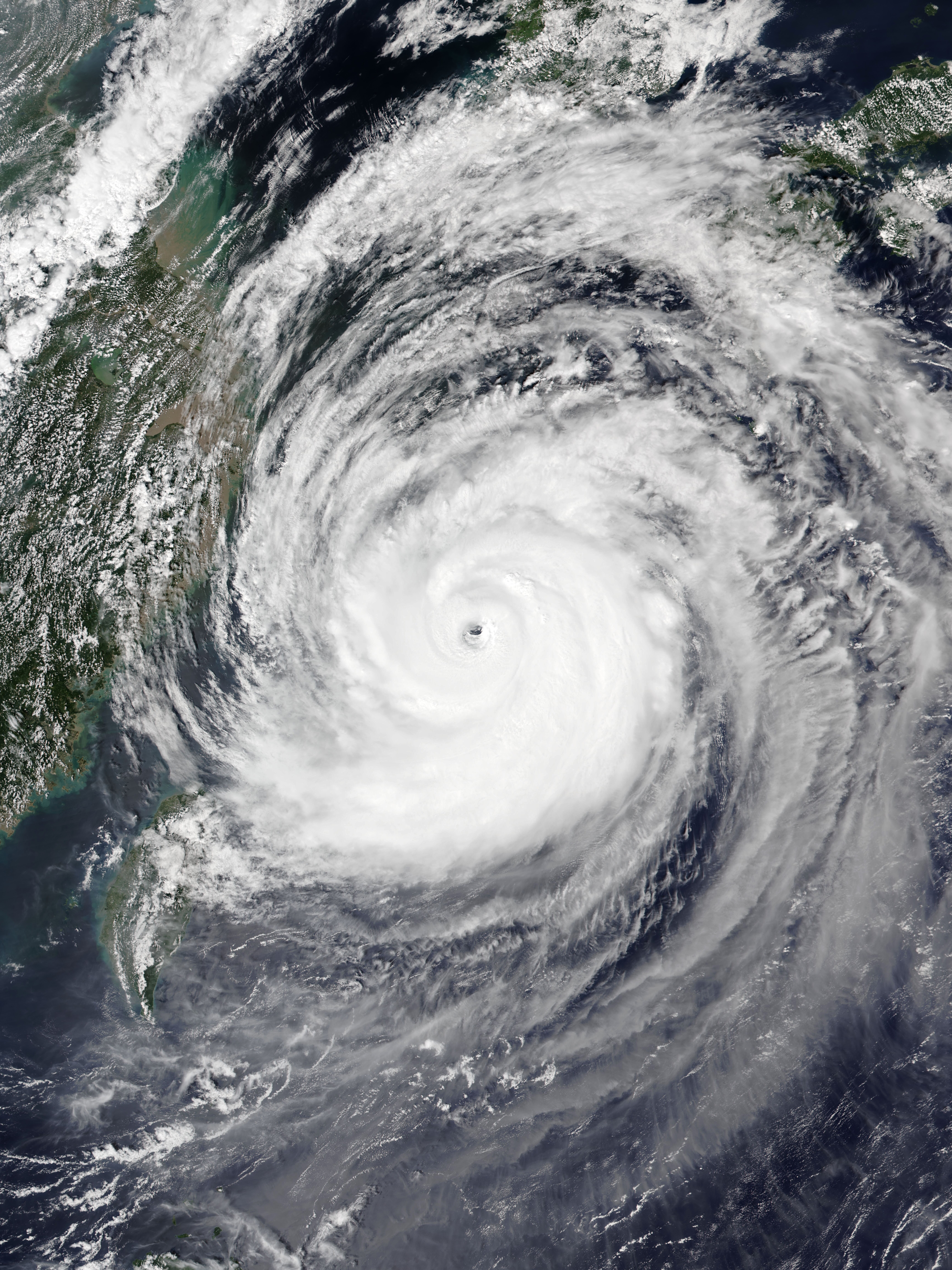
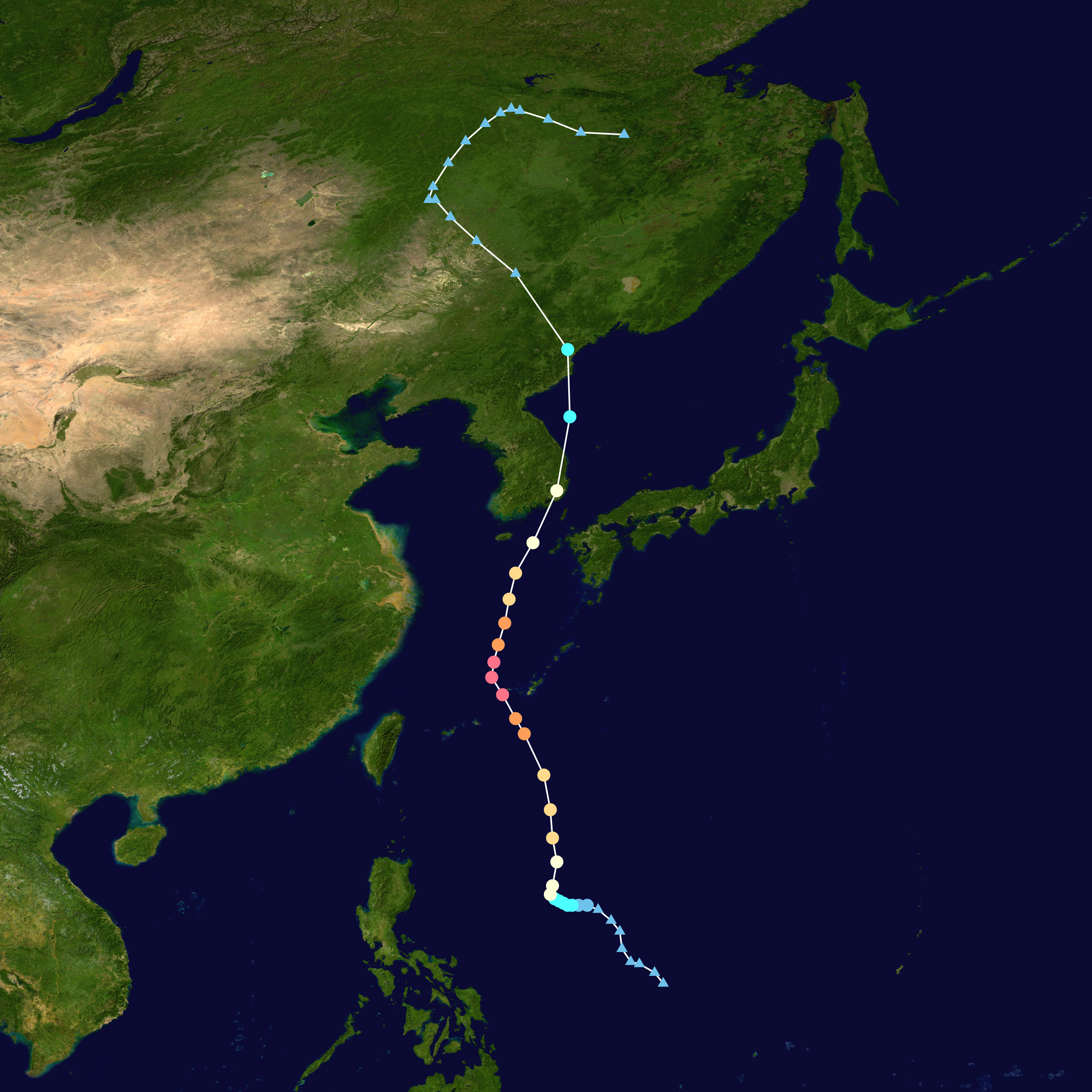
- Duration: August 27 – September 3
- Peak intensity: 175 km/h (110 mph) (10-min); 935 hPa (mbar)

An area of low pressure was formed in the Northern Mariana Islands. The disturbance then entered PAR on August 27, and a Tropical Cyclone Formation Alert was issued for the system. Early on August 28, PAGASA upgraded it to a tropical depression, receiving the local name Julian, JTWC later assigned the disturbance as Tropical Depression 10W, shortly before the JMA upgraded it to a tropical storm and assigned the international name Maysak. The JTWC later followed suit in upgrading into a tropical storm. A few hours later, Maysak later became a severe tropical storm despite its elongated low-level circulation center. The presence of low wind shear and warm sea temperatures allows Maysak for any rapid intensifications. On August 31, it became a Category 4-equivalent typhoon. Maysak held this intensity as it began to move into a less conducive environment for storm development within the East China Sea. Soon, Maysak began to weaken steadily as it passed the East China Sea, slowing back down to Category 3-equivalent winds.

Typhoon Maysak then made landfall near Busan, South Korea at 02:20 KST on September 3 (17:20 UTC on September 2), with 10-minute maximum sustained winds at 155 kilometers per hour (96 mph) and the central pressure at 950 hPa (28.05 inHg). equivalent to a Category 2 typhoon. After that, it crossed the Sea of Japan and hitting Hwadae County in North Korea into Jilin, Manchuria in China. Soon after, Typhoon Maysak degenerated into an extratropical low in northeast China.

=== Typhoon Haishen (Kristine) ===
- Violent typhoon (JMA)
- Category 4 super typhoon (SSHWS)
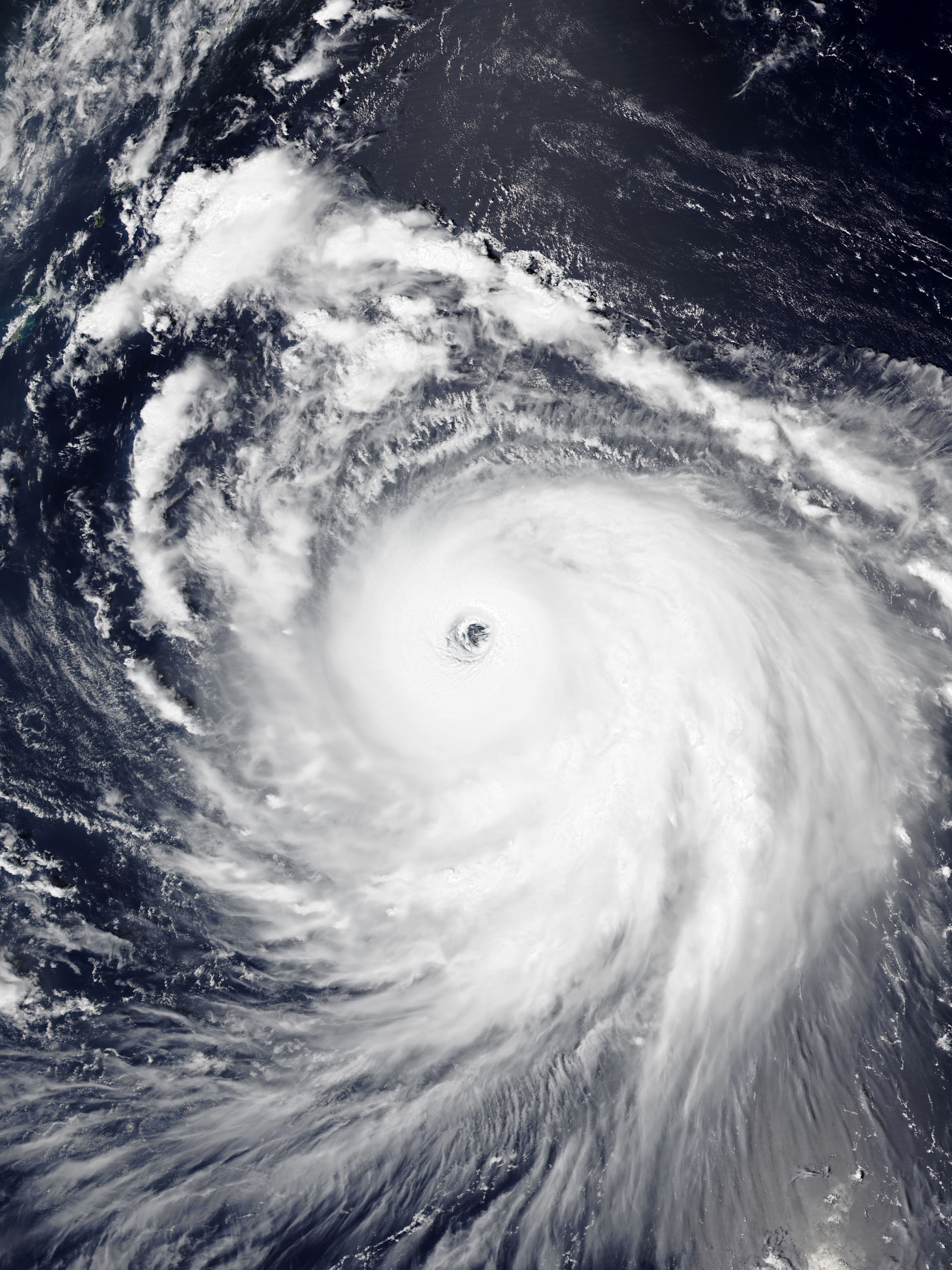
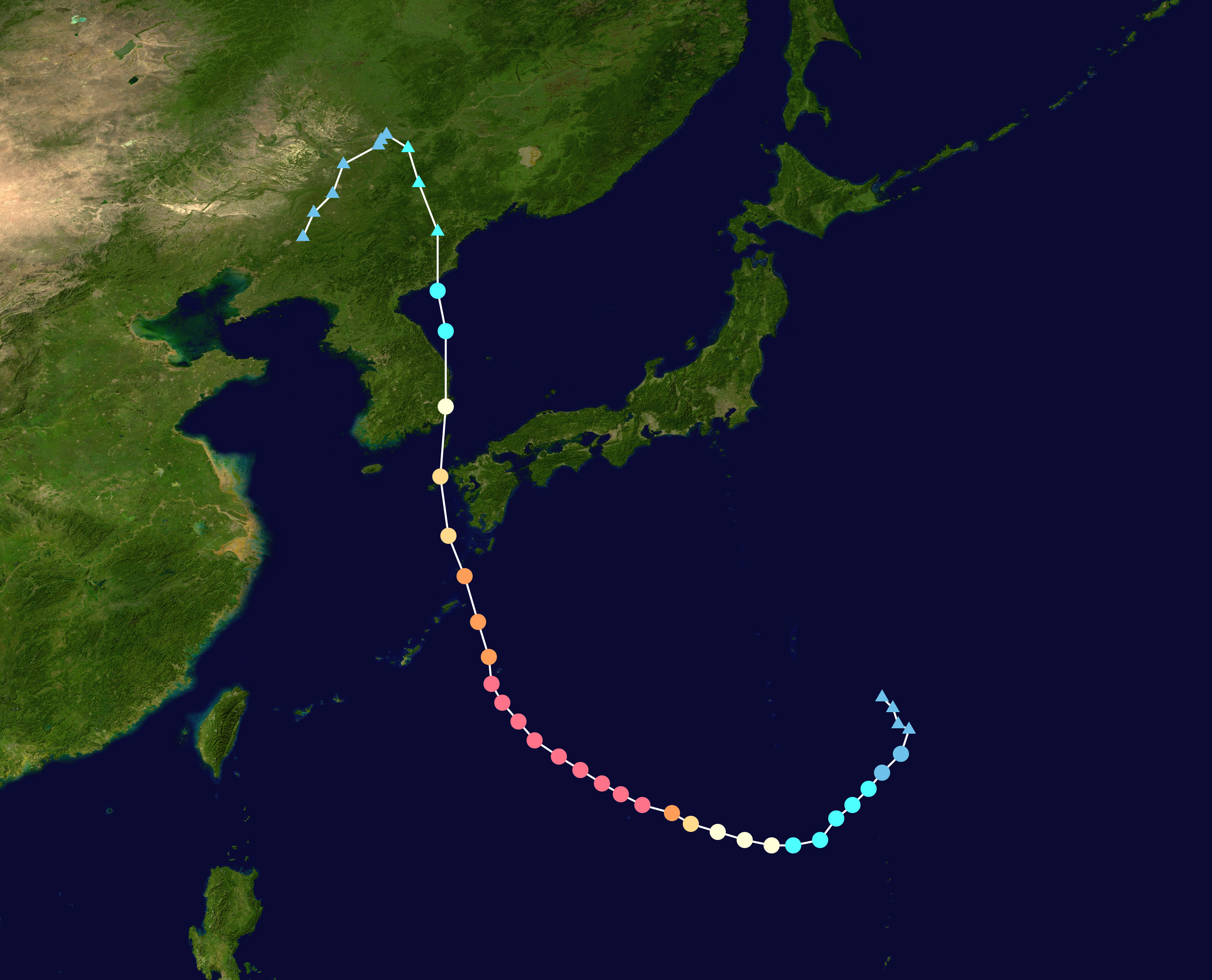
- Duration: August 30 – September 7
- Peak intensity: 195 km/h (120 mph) (10-min); 910 hPa (mbar)

While Typhoon Maysak is holding its peak intensity, JTWC announced another formation of a very disorganized tropical disturbance situated a couple hundred miles northeast of Guam. By the next day, the disturbance had quickly organized, and the JTWC issued a Tropical Cyclone Formation Alert (TCFA) for the low-pressure area. On the following day, the disturbance later designated as Tropical Depression 11W. Traversing generally southwestward, the depression quickly intensified into a tropical storm, with JMA gaining the name Haishen. Under very favorable conditions, Haishen is allowed to do any intensification, which resulted in upgrading into Category 3-typhoon.

PAGASA announced that Haishen entered Philippine Area of Responsibility (PAR), naming the system as Kristine. Early on September 4, the JTWC assessed that Haishen became a Category 4-equivalent super typhoon – with 1-minute sustained wind speeds of 135 kt (155 mph (249 km/h), with a clear, symmetrical eye visible on satellite imagery. Haishen's latitude increased, the ocean heat content in the area decreased, resulting of weakening below super typhoon status. Later that day, the system left the PAR and PAGASA issued its last bulletin on the typhoon. As the system continued its northward track toward the Japanese archipelago, it continued to weaken and became a Category 3-equivalent typhoon, and not too long after it weakened to a Category 2-equivalent typhoon as it neared the Southern Ryukyu Islands of Japan. A mandatory evacuation order was issued for western Japan as millions of people evacuated accordingly. Haishen made landfall in Ulsan, South Korea at around 09:00 KST (00:00 UTC) on September 7.

=== Tropical Depression 12W ===
- Tropical depression (JMA)
- Tropical depression (SSHWS)
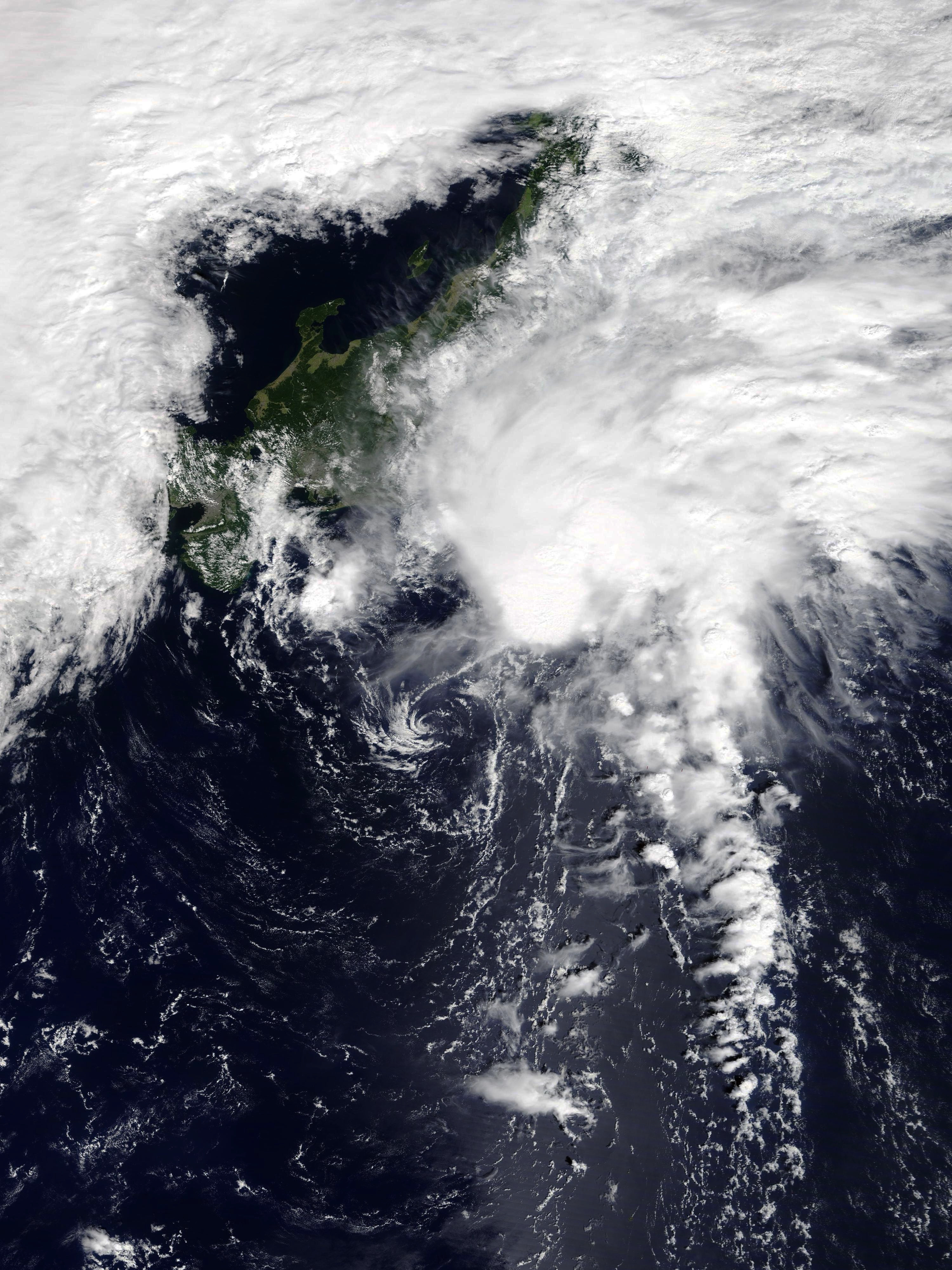
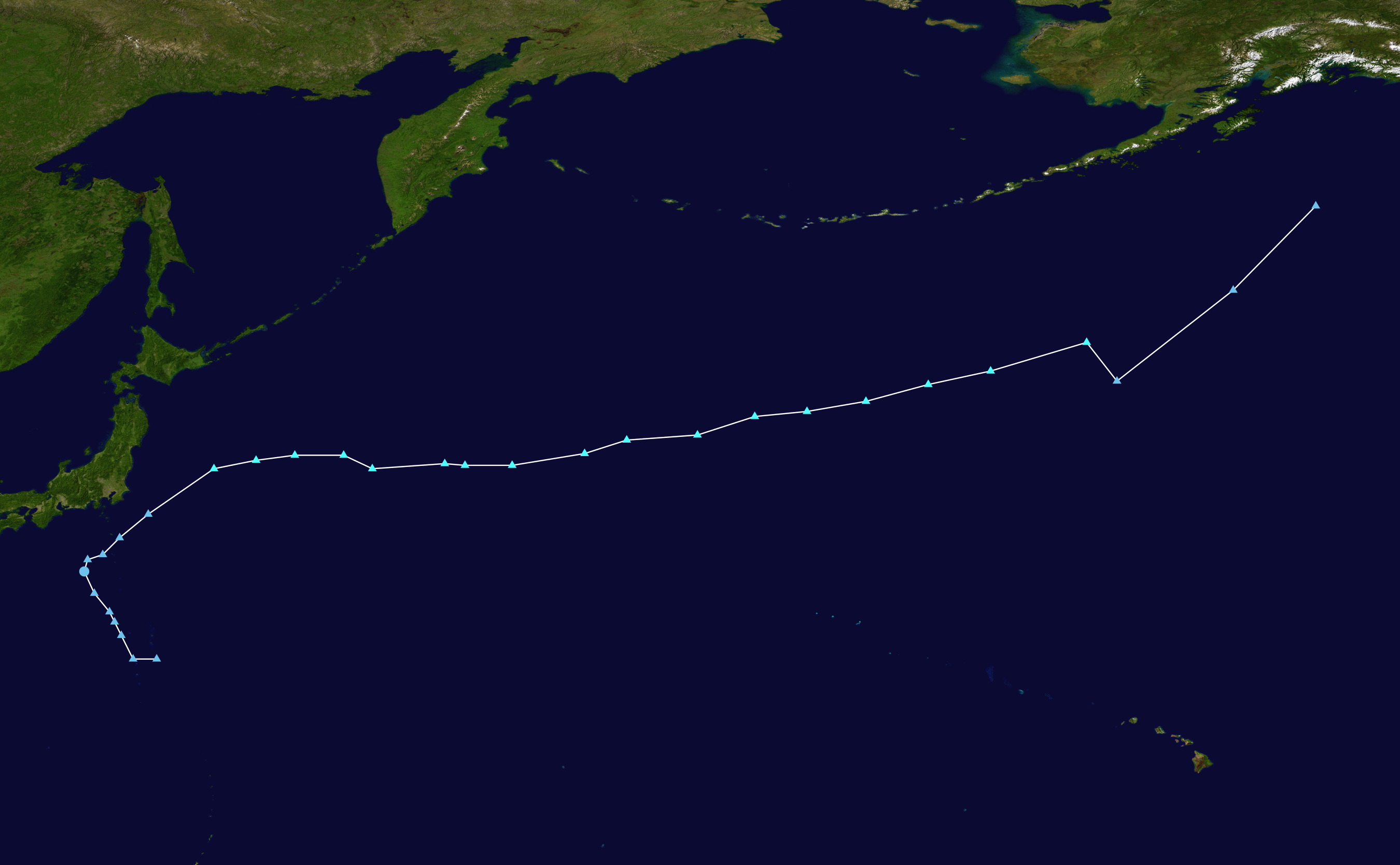
- Duration: September 10 – September 12
- Peak intensity: 55 km/h (35 mph) (10-min); 1006 hPa (mbar)

On September 10 at 00:00 UTC, the JMA began tracking a tropical depression. At 15:00 UTC that day, the JTWC issued a Tropical Cyclone Formation Alert on the system. On September 11 at 18:00 UTC, the JTWC upgraded the disturbance to a tropical depression, designating it as 12W; it was downgraded back to a tropical disturbance six hours later. The JMA had stopped tracking the depression by September 13.

=== Tropical Storm Noul (Leon) ===
- Tropical storm (JMA)
- Tropical storm (SSHWS)
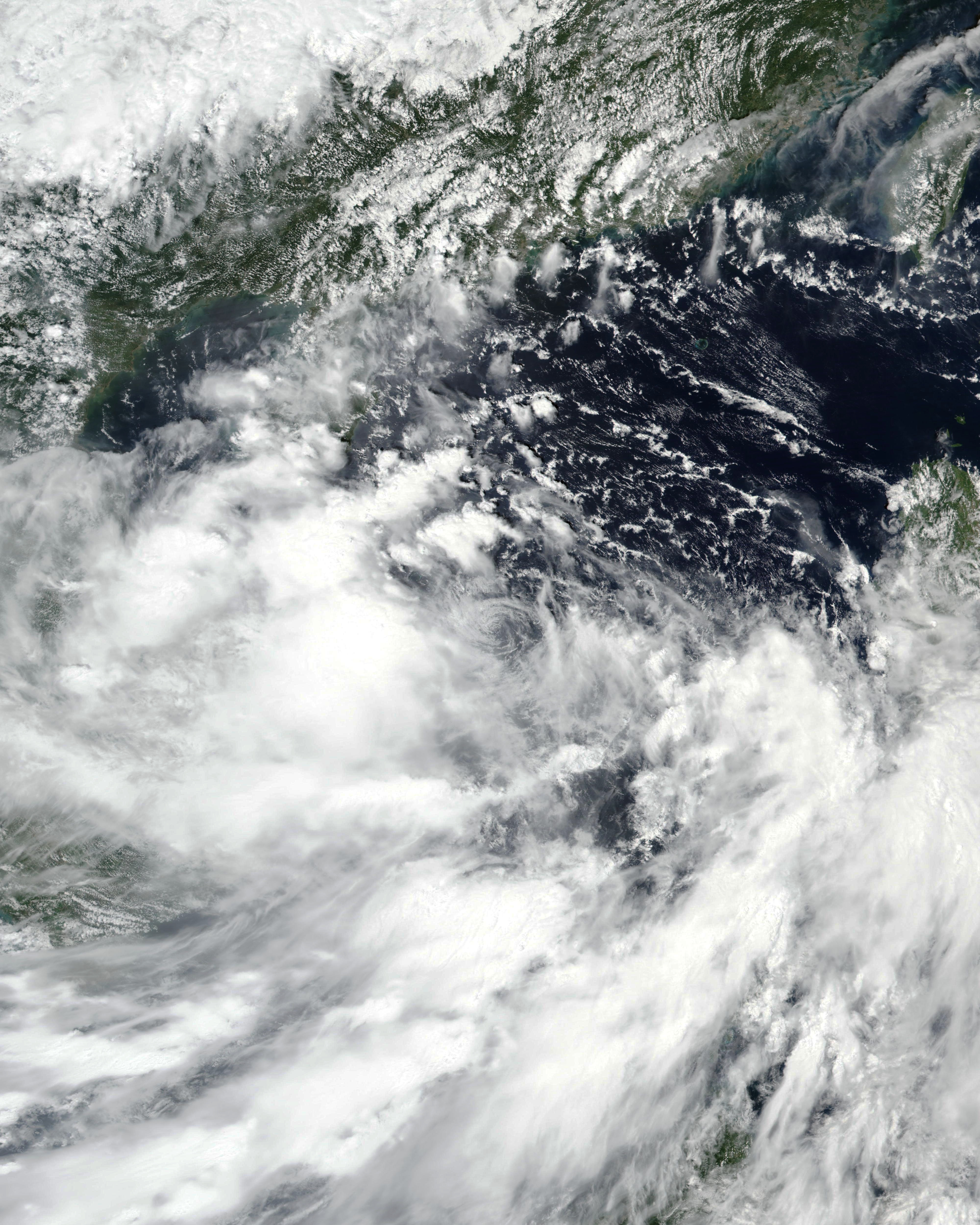
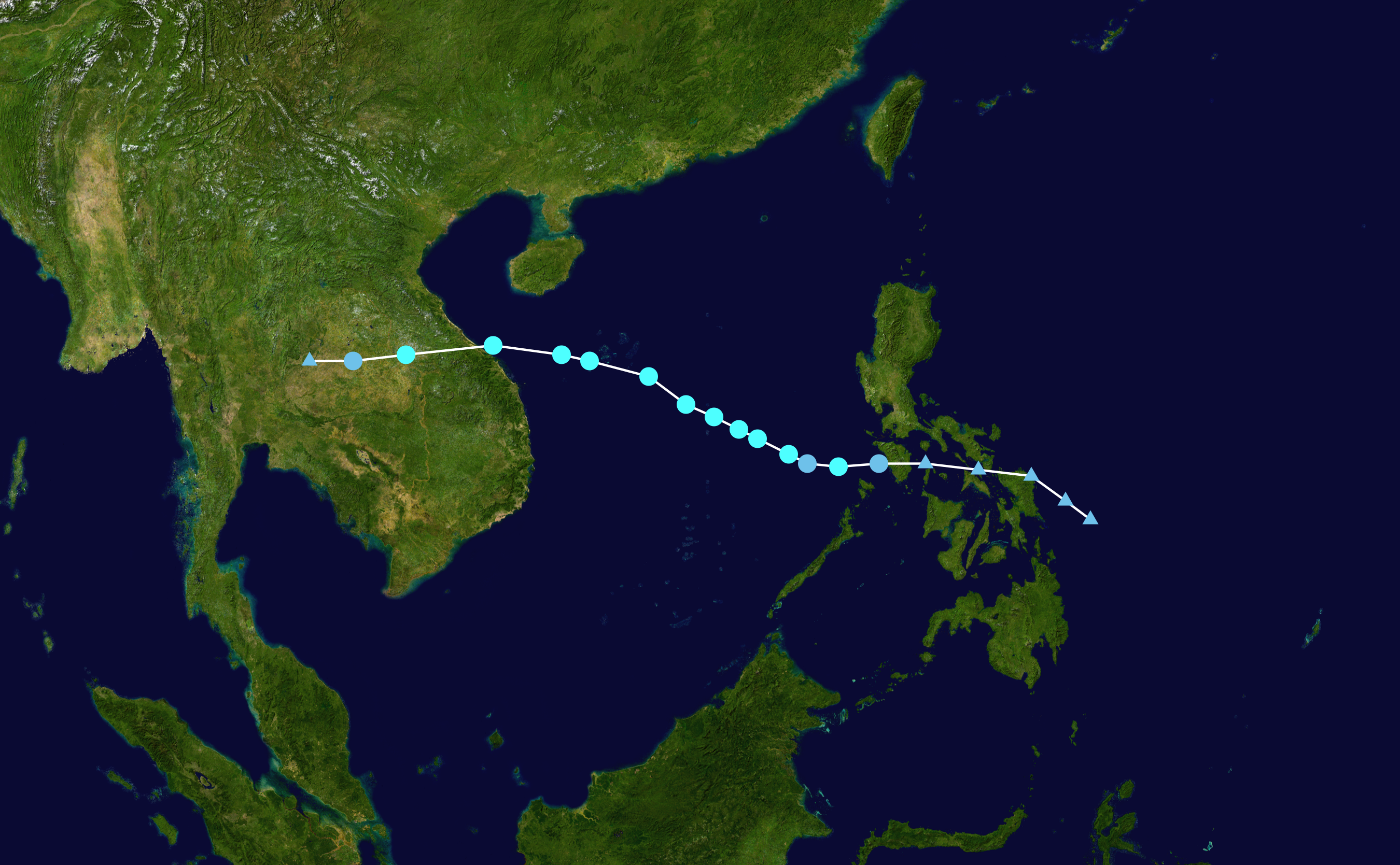
- Duration: September 15 – September 18
- Peak intensity: 85 km/h (50 mph) (10-min); 992 hPa (mbar)

On September 14 at 12:00 UTC, the JMA began tracking a tropical depression. On the morning of September 15, the JTWC issued a tropical cyclone formation alert for a tropical system forming in the Philippine Sea. The JTWC later upgraded it to a tropical depression at 15:00 UTC as they issued their first warning on the system as Tropical Depression 13W. Since the depression formed inside of the Philippine Area of Responsibility (PAR), the PAGASA immediately issued a severe weather bulletin on the storm and named the system Leon. At 21:00 on September 16, the storm left the PAR and PAGASA issued its final warning on the system. At 03:00 UTC September 18, Noul made landfall between Quảng Trị and Thừa Thiên-Huế provinces. At 09:00 UTC, the JTWC issued its final warning on the system. After being downgraded to a low-pressure area (LPA), Noul followed a westward path and emerged in the Indian Ocean.

A few days before the storm hit Vietnam, the Vietnamese government closed three airports and evacuated more than one million people in the affected areas. Noul damaged homes and knocked down trees and power lines in Hue, Vietnam. Heavy precipitation amounts peaking at 310 mm (12 in) fell in Da Nang. The storm caused 6 deaths and 705 billion đồng (US$30.4 million) in damage.

=== Severe Tropical Storm Dolphin (Marce) ===
- Severe tropical storm (JMA)
- Tropical storm (SSHWS)
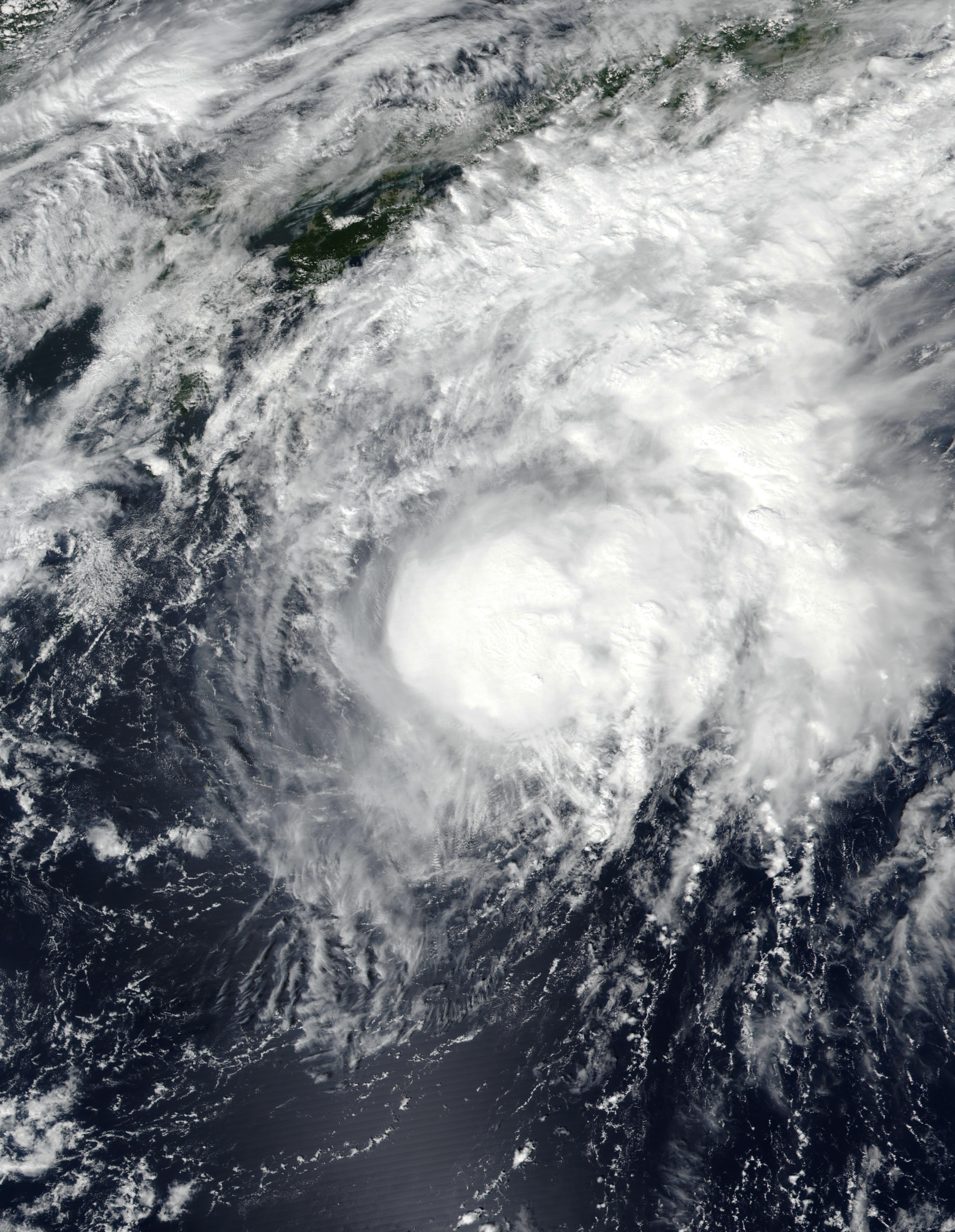
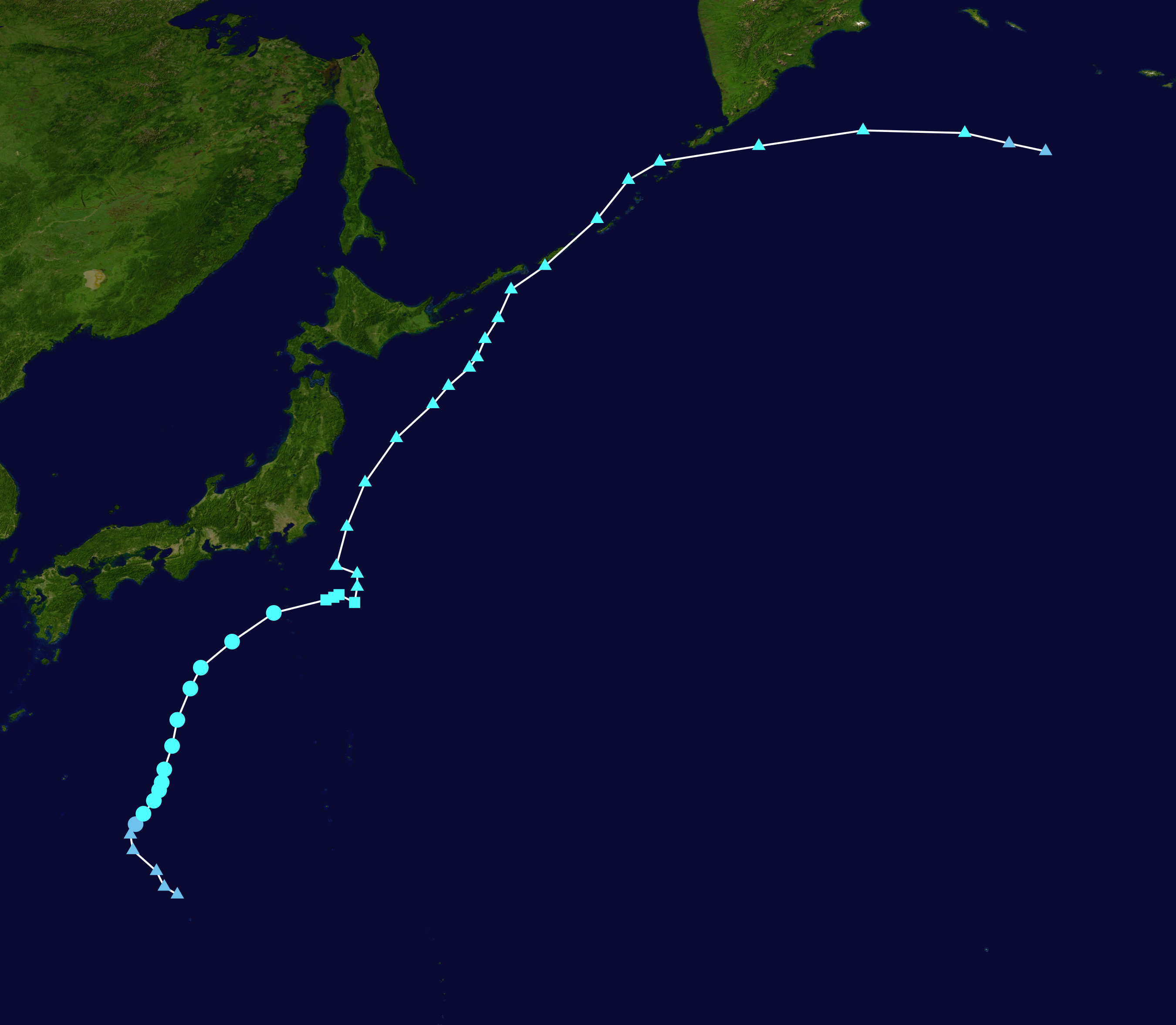
- Duration: September 19 – September 24
- Peak intensity: 110 km/h (70 mph) (10-min); 975 hPa (mbar)

On September 20 at 06:00 UTC, as a tropical disturbance strengthened in the extreme northeast corner of the Philippine Area of Responsibility, PAGASA upgraded the system to a tropical depression, giving it the local name Marce. At the time, the JTWC only recognized the system as an area of convection and only issued a medium level of warning for the system. The JTWC upgraded the system to a tropical storm at 12:00 UTC. On September 21 at 03:00 UTC, the system left the Philippine Area of Responsibility. The system then intensified into a tropical storm south of Japan, and was given the international name Dolphin by the JMA. After the storm transitioned into an extratropical cyclone, the JTWC issued its final warning on the system on September 24 at 03:00 UTC.

=== Severe Tropical Storm Kujira ===
- Severe tropical storm (JMA)
- Category 1 typhoon (SSHWS)
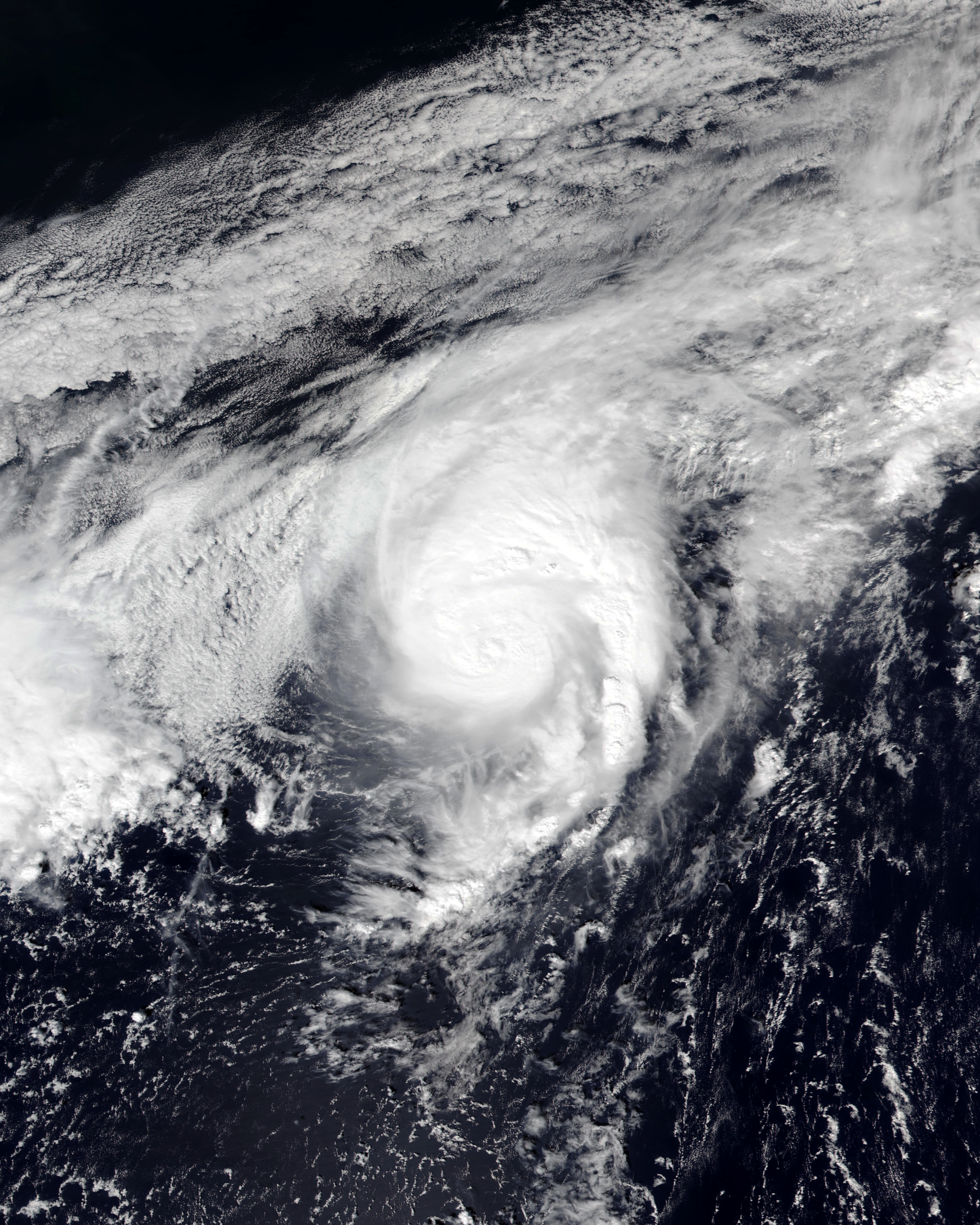
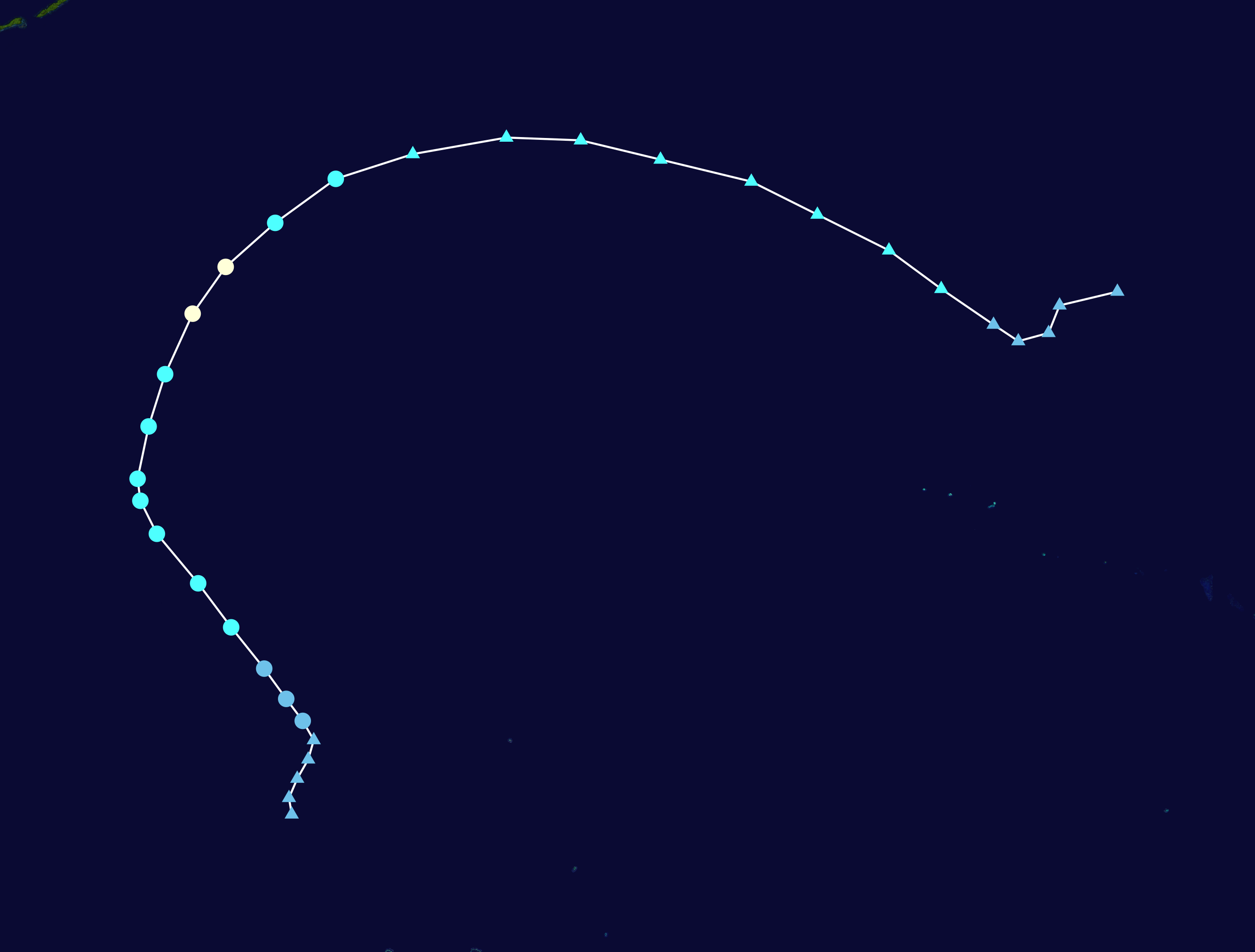
- Duration: September 25 – September 30
- Peak intensity: 110 km/h (70 mph) (10-min); 980 hPa (mbar)

On September 25, The JTWC first noted the possibility of tropical cyclone formation from an area of convection northeast of the Northern Mariana Islands. Over the next few days, the system organized and on September 27, both the JMA and the JTWC upgraded the system to a tropical storm, with the JMA assigning the name Kujira. The storm drifted north-northwestwards before recurving to the northeast while intensifying into a Category 1-equivalent typhoon early on September 29. Kujira weakened to a tropical storm 12 hours after it intensified into a typhoon due to very high wind shear and cool waters. At 21:00 UTC, the JTWC issued the last advisory for the system.

=== Typhoon Chan-hom ===
- Typhoon (JMA)
- Category 1 typhoon (SSHWS)
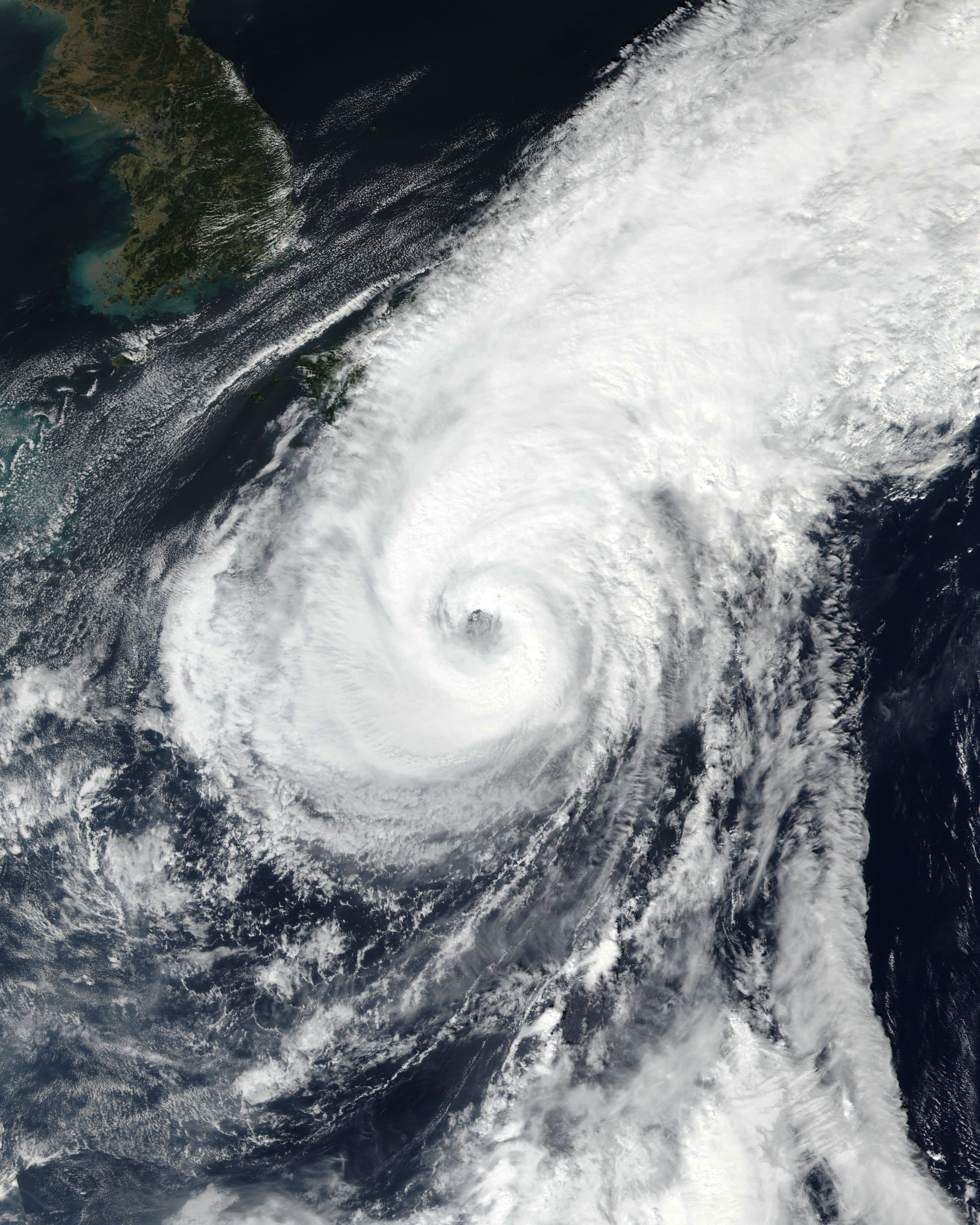
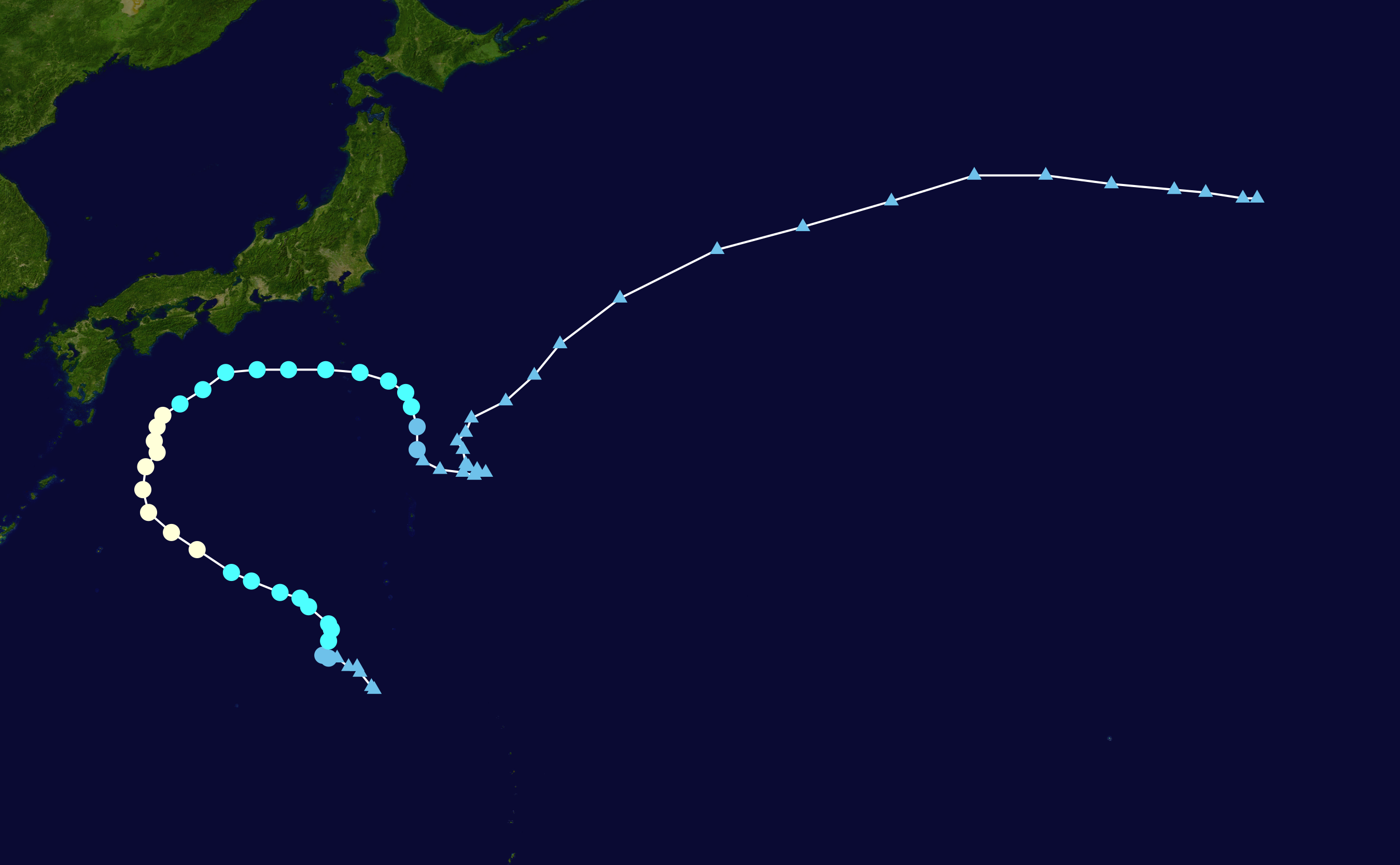
- Duration: October 4 – October 17
- Peak intensity: 130 km/h (80 mph) (10-min); 965 hPa (mbar)

On October 2, the JTWC began to monitor a large area of thunderstorms in the open Pacific Ocean. The system gradually organized, and it was classified as a tropical depression on October 4. On the next day, the JMA upgraded the storm to a tropical storm and named it Chan-hom. On October 7, the system was upgraded by the JMA into a typhoon. The JMA issued their final warning on the system on October 12 at 00:45 UTC. The JTWC later followed, issuing their final warning on the system at 09:00 UTC. The JMA, however, still tracked Chan-hom as a tropical depression until it was last noted on October 16.

=== Tropical Storm Linfa ===
- Tropical storm (JMA)
- Tropical storm (SSHWS)
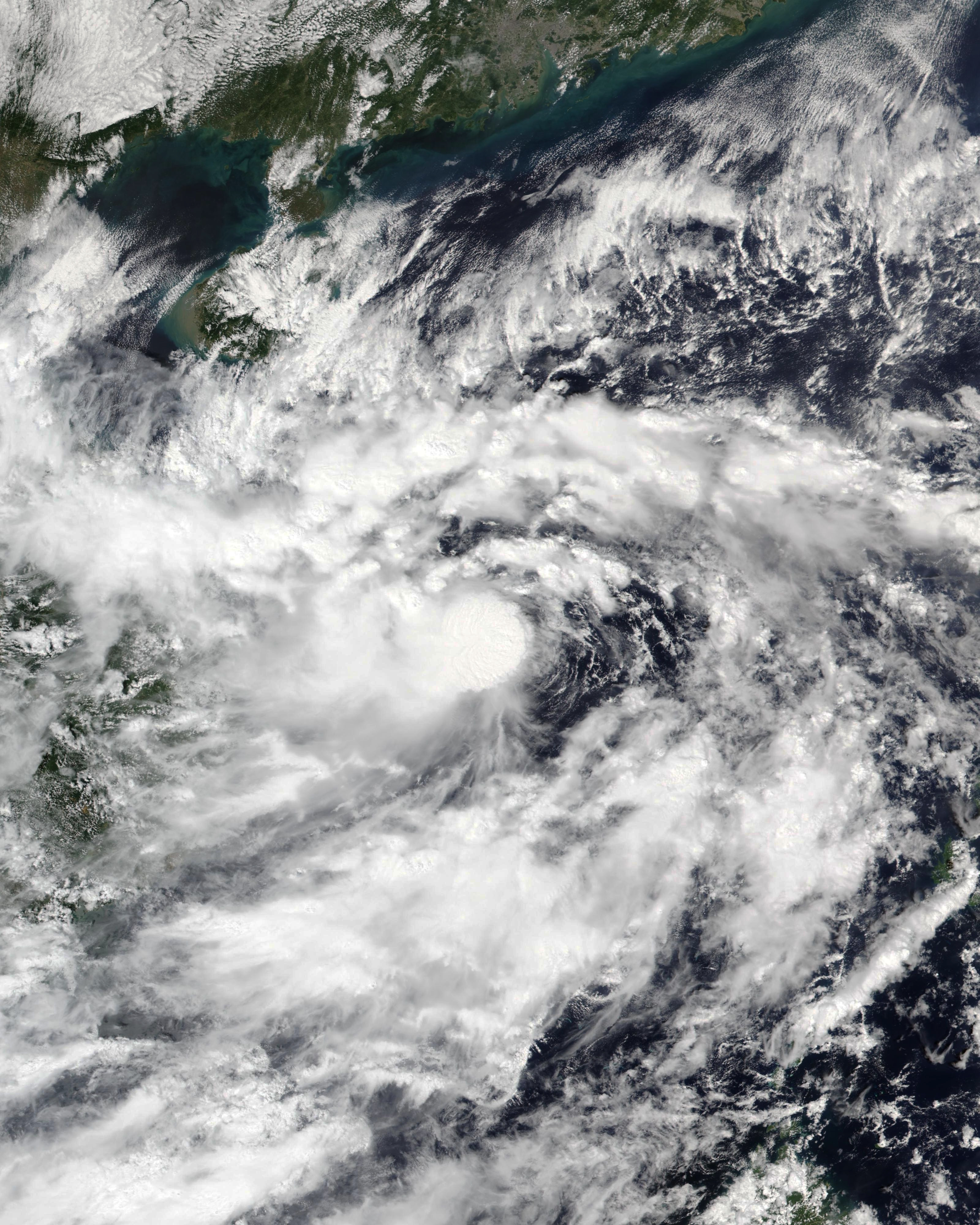
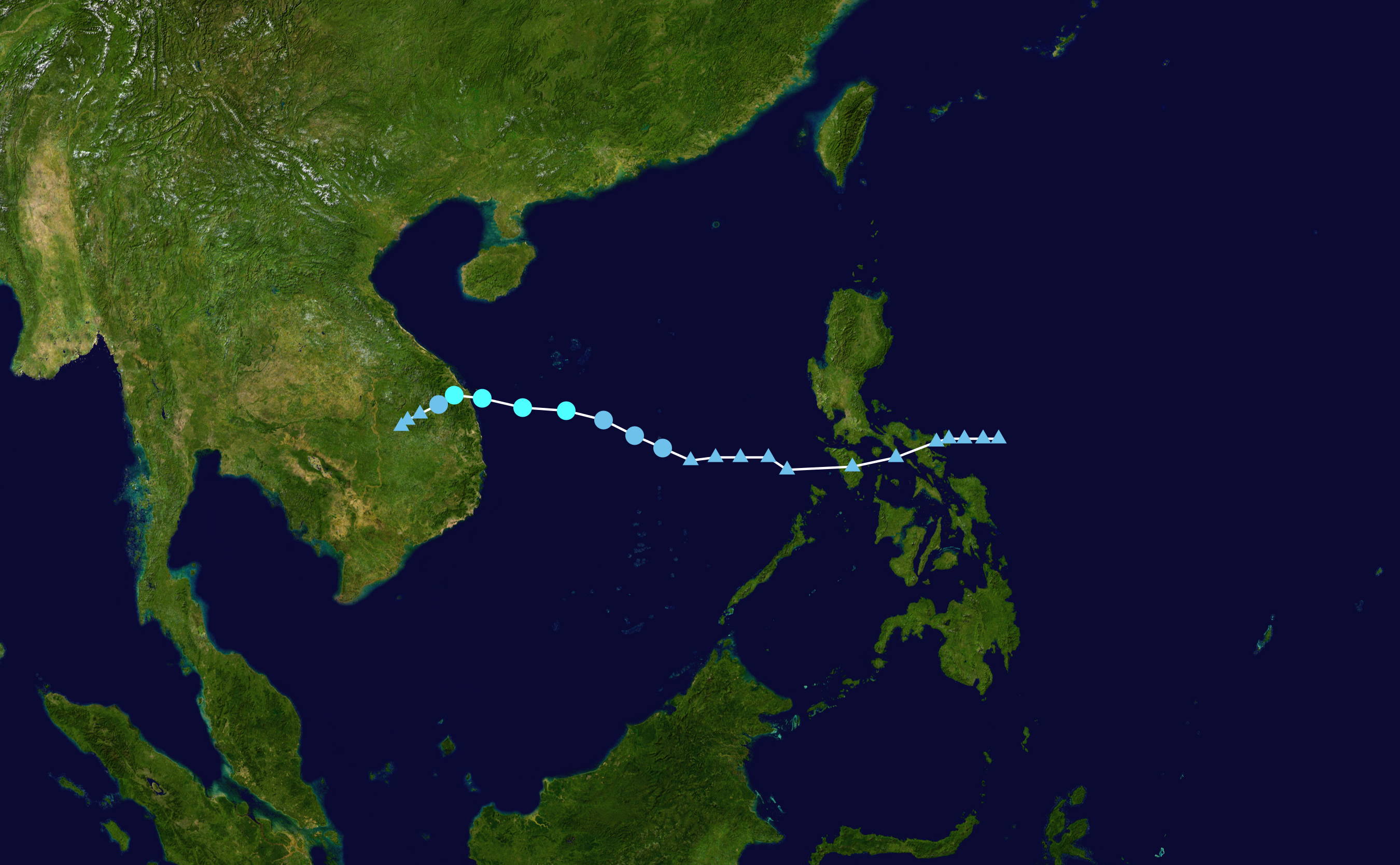
- Duration: October 6 – October 12
- Peak intensity: 85 km/h (50 mph) (10-min); 994 hPa (mbar)

On October 9, the JTWC began tracking a tropical system east-southeast of Da Nang, Vietnam. On October 10, the system was declared as a tropical depression by the JTWC and the JMA. Later that day, the JMA upgraded the system into a tropical storm and named it Linfa. The system continued westward, making landfall on October 11 at 03:00 UTC in Vietnam. The JTWC issued their final warning on the system at 09:00 UTC that day. The JMA later followed, issuing their final warning on the system at 18:00 UTC.

Linfa brought historic amounts of rainfall to Central Vietnam, peaking at 90.16 inches (2,290 mm) in A Lưới (Huế), 59.842 inches (1,520.0 mm) in Hướng Linh (Quảng Trị). That made it the 12th wettest tropical cyclone in history. At least 370,000 people in Vietnam lost power after the storm. So far the storm and its flood have left 104 people dead and 38 remain missing in Vietnam and Cambodia. In Cambodia, severe flooding affected 16 provinces including Phnom Penh, killed at least 21 people, damaged over 25,000 homes over and over 180,000 hectares of farmland.

=== Tropical Storm Nangka (Nika) ===
- Tropical storm (JMA)
- Tropical storm (SSHWS)
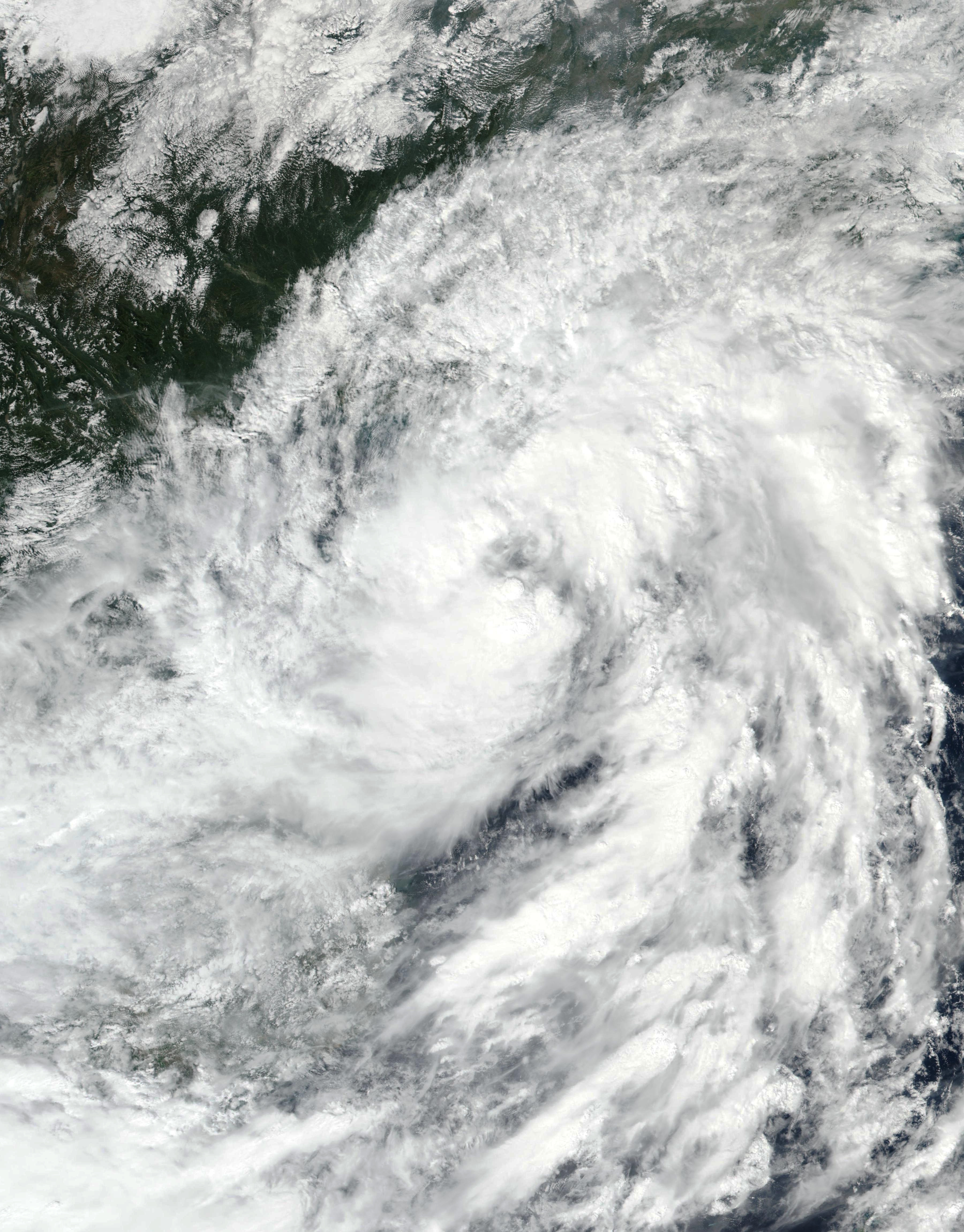
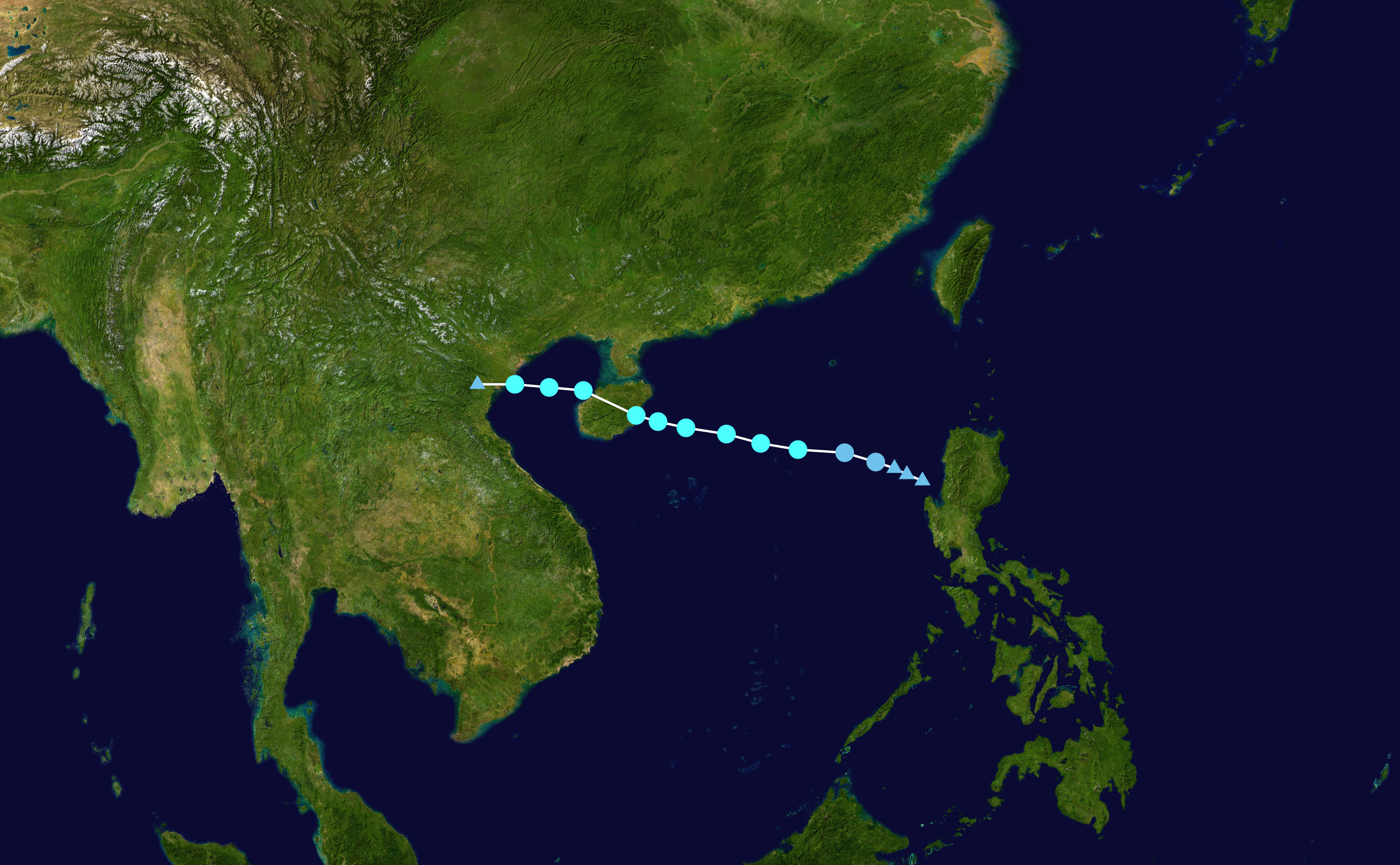
- Duration: October 11 – October 14
- Peak intensity: 85 km/h (50 mph) (10-min); 990 hPa (mbar)

On October 11, the JMA began tracking a tropical depression off the west coast of Luzon. The PAGASA declared the system as a tropical depression at 12:00 UTC, and since the storm formed inside of the Philippine Area of Responsibility (PAR) the agency named the system Nika. On the same day at 21:00, the JTWC began issuing warnings on the system. On October 12, the system was declared a tropical storm by the JMA, and was named Nangka. At 09:00 UTC, the system left the PAR and the PAGASA issued its final bulletin on the system. At 19:20 CST (11:20 UTC) on October 13, Nangka made landfall over Qionghai, Hainan.

On October 13, the storm crossed the Gulf of Tonkin and made landfall in the Nam Định, Ninh Bình, and Thanh Hóa provinces in Northern Vietnam on October 14. On the same day, both the JMA and JTWC issued their final warnings for the system. The system dissipated on October 14, 2020.

After the passage of Nangka over Hainan Island, 2 people died and 4 are missing as a result of a capsized boat. In Northern Vietnam, the storm killed 2 people in Hòa Bình, another missing in Yên Bái. Over 585 houses were destroyed, while 135,731 others across central Vietnam were flooded.

=== Tropical Depression Ofel ===
- Tropical depression (JMA)
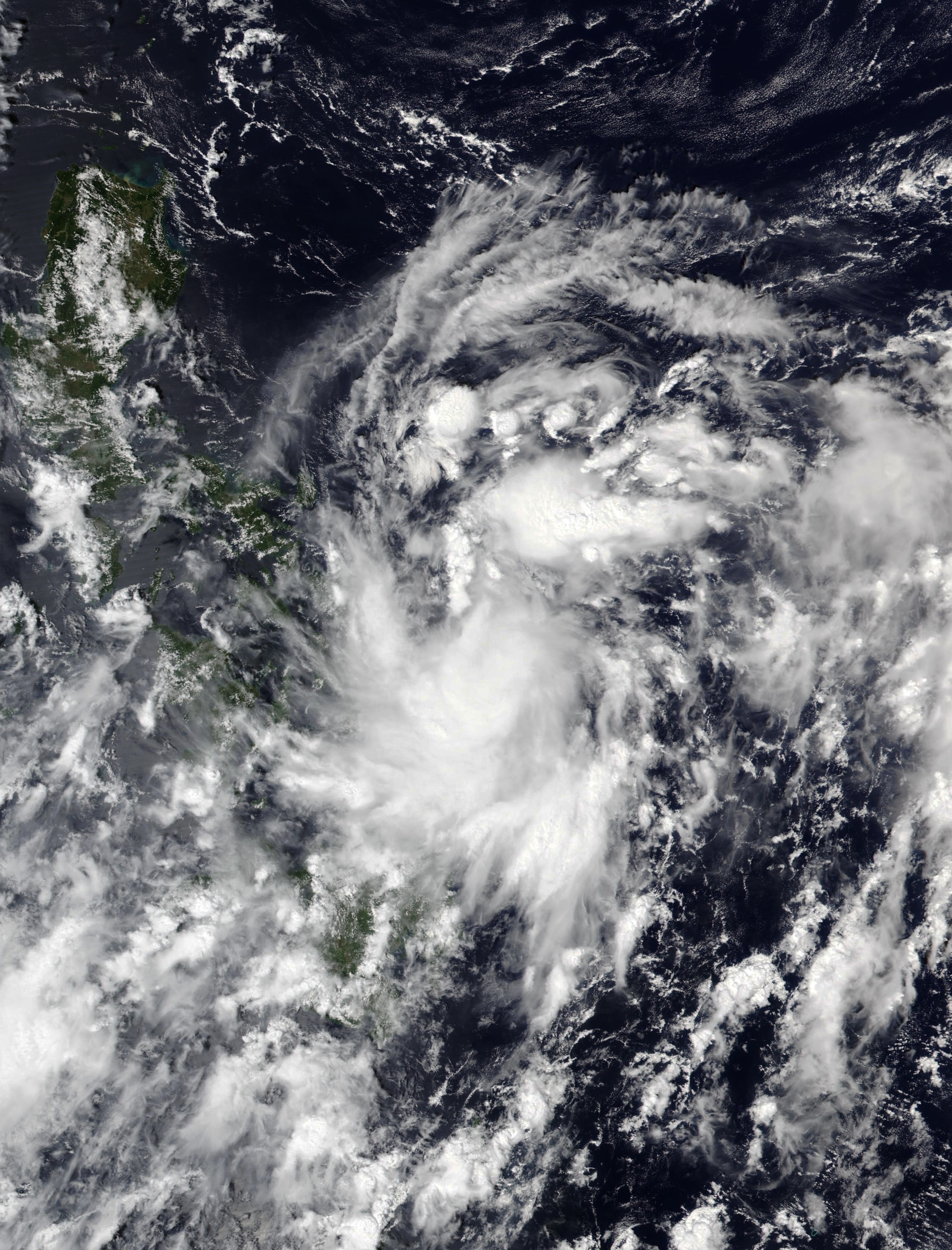
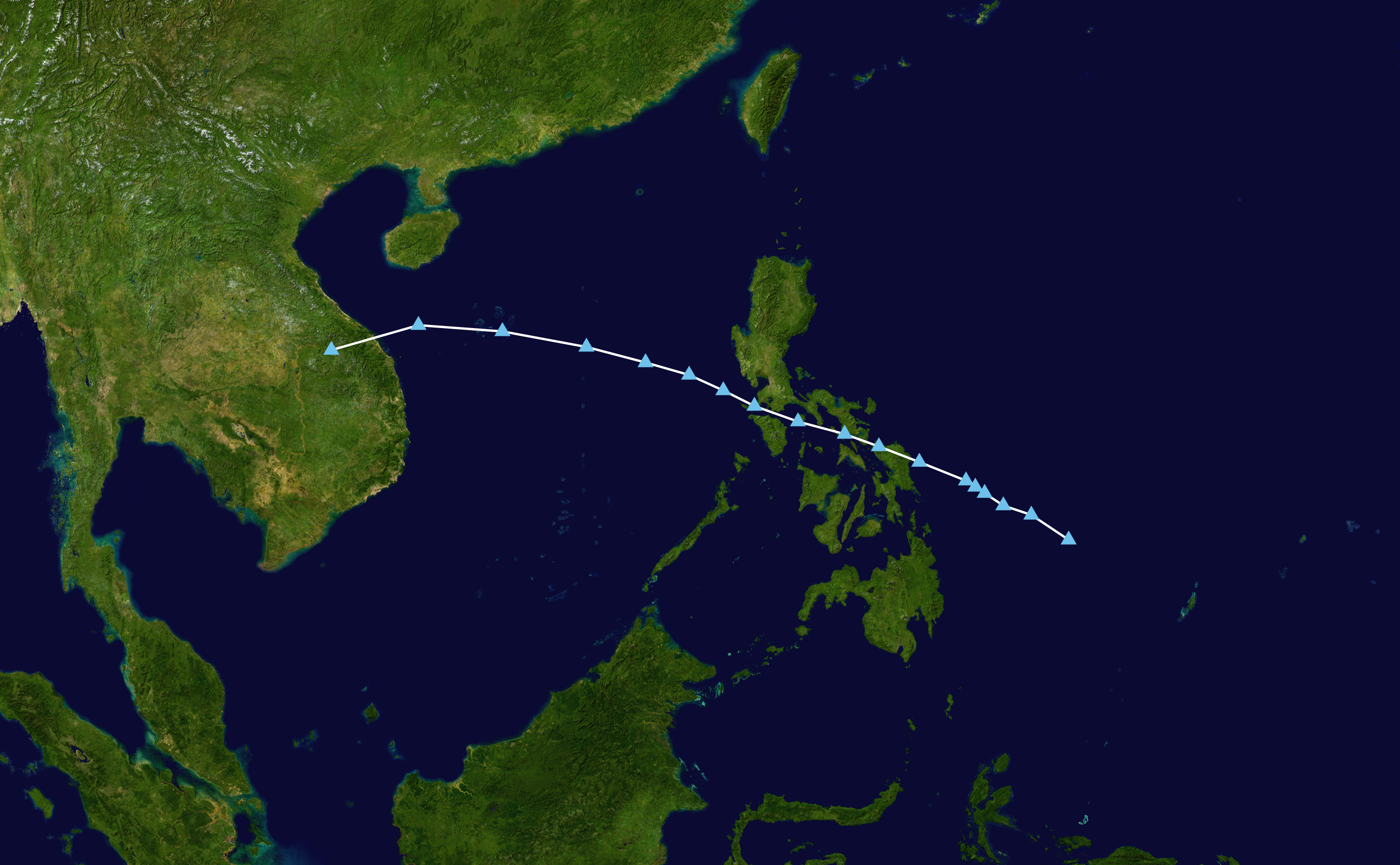
- Duration: October 13 – October 16
- Peak intensity: <55 km/h (35 mph) (10-min); 1002 hPa (mbar)

A low-pressure area formed in the Philippine Sea, east of Leyte, on October 13. Soon, the PAGASA declared the newly formed system as a tropical depression and assigned it the name Ofel. The PAGASA immediately raised warning signals for the province of Sorsogon and for parts of the Samar province. On the same day at 18:30 UTC, Ofel made landfall over Can-avid, Eastern Samar. As the system entered the South China Sea in the early hours of October 15 UTC, the PAGASA lifted all tropical cyclone warning signals for Ofel. On the same day at 20:00 UTC, Ofel left the Philippine Area of Responsibility (PAR) and PAGASA issued their final bulletin for the system. While Ofel was inside the PAR, the Joint Typhoon Warning Center issued tropical cyclone formation alerts for the system, however it was canceled as the system entered a less favorable environment on October 16. The storm dissipated at 03:00 UTC on that day.

Flooding was reported due to moderate to heavy rains. According to the Department of Agriculture Regional Office 5, total damages have topped to an estimated ₱9.1 million (US$187,000).

=== Typhoon Saudel (Pepito) ===
- Typhoon (JMA)
- Category 1 typhoon (SSHWS)
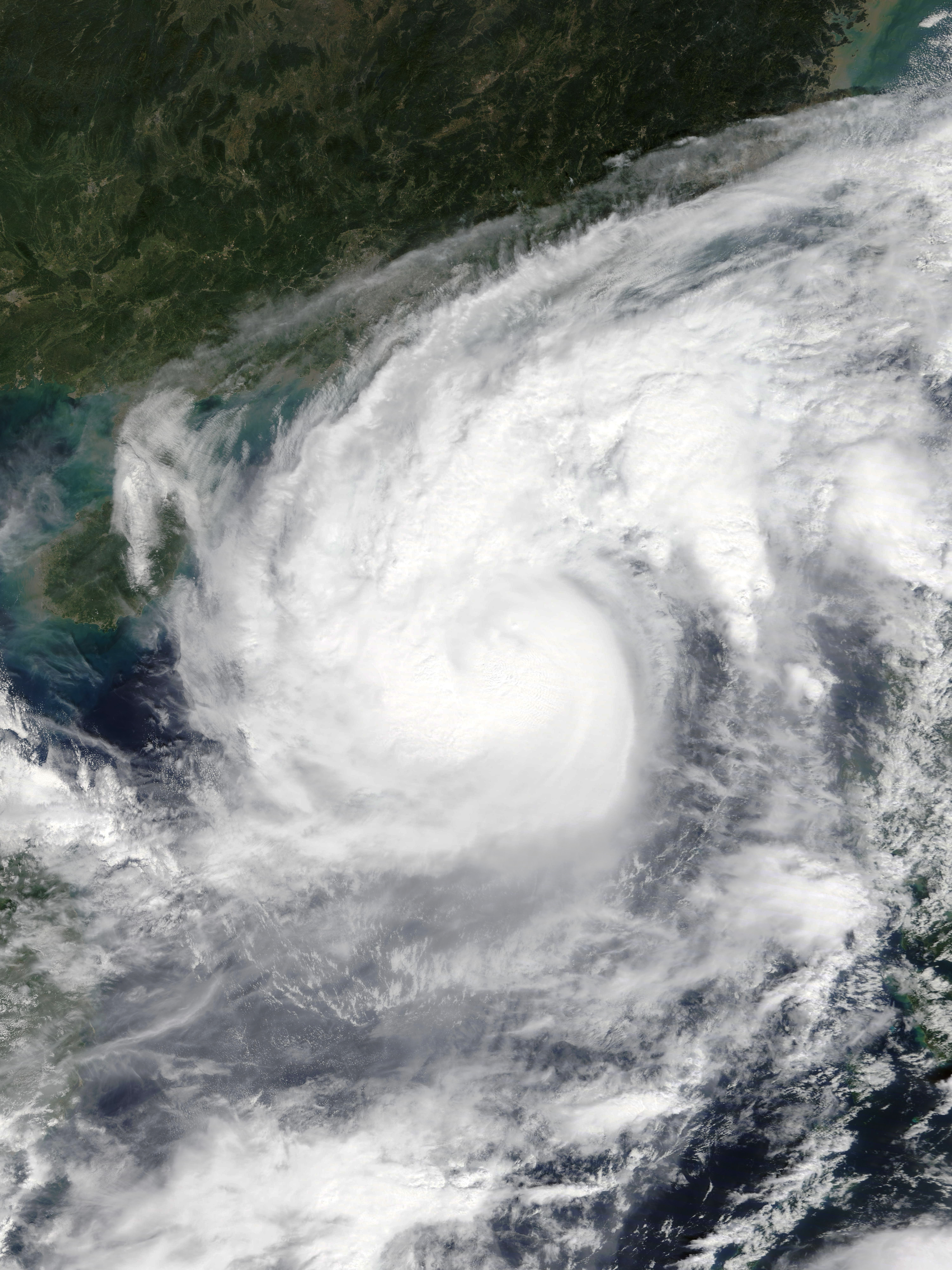
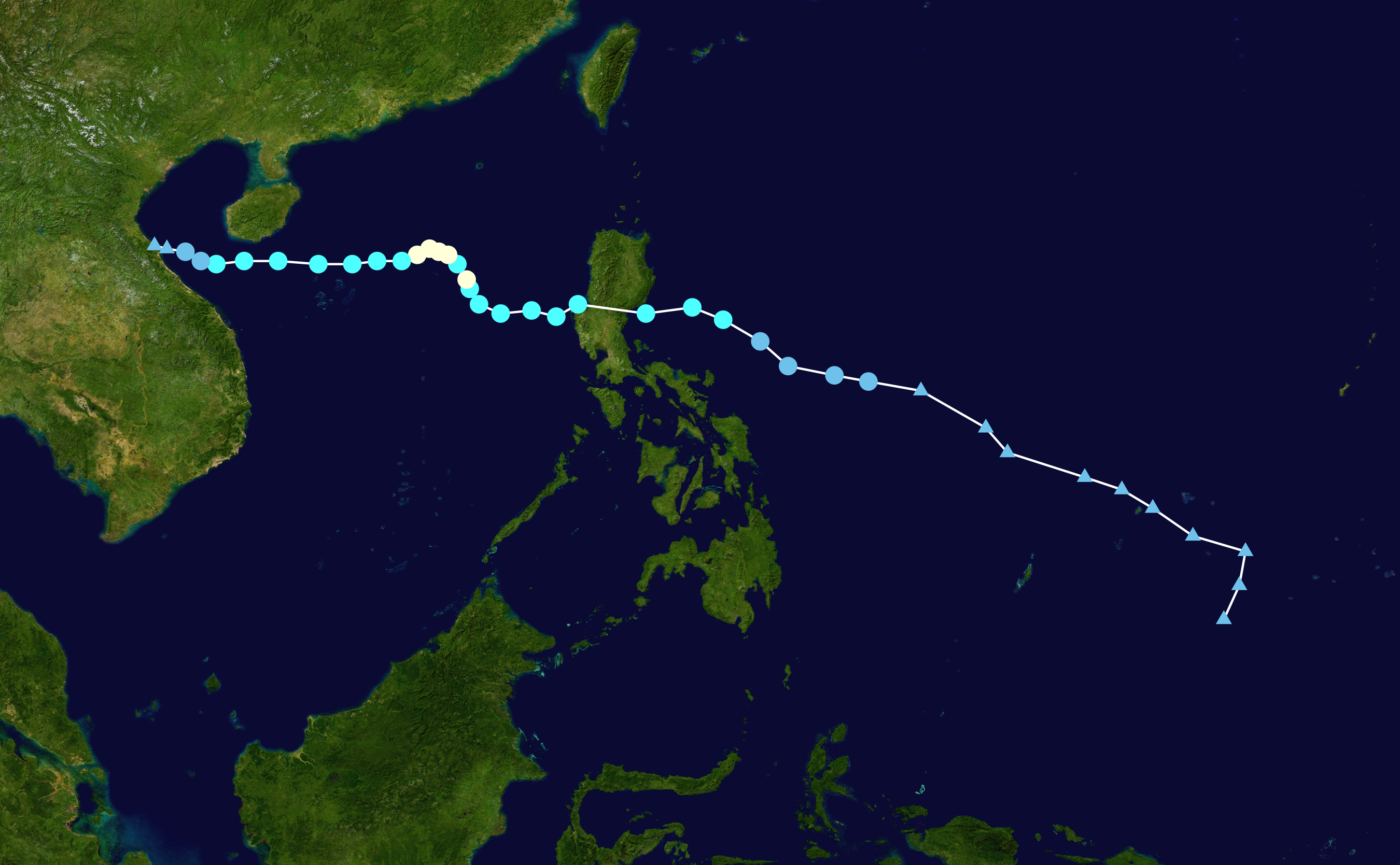
- Duration: October 18 – October 25
- Peak intensity: 120 km/h (75 mph) (10-min); 975 hPa (mbar)

On October 16 UTC, the JTWC began tracking an area of convection approximately 463 nautical miles (857 km) east-southeast of Palau. On October 18 at 21:00 UTC, the PAGASA upgraded the system into a tropical depression, and named the system Pepito. A few hours later, the JMA also recognized the system into a tropical depression, and subsequently issued their first warning on the system. As the system intensified as it approached Northern Luzon, the JMA upgraded the system into a tropical storm and named the system Saudel. The PAGASA also declared the system as a tropical storm, and began issuing Signal #2 tropical cyclone warnings in preparation for its landfall. Saudel made landfall over the San Ildefonso Peninsula in Casiguran, Aurora on October 20 at 13:00 UTC (21:00 PHT) and began crossing the Luzon Island. Saudel made another landfall over Anda, Pangasinan before emerging over the South China Sea hours later. As the storm left the Philippine Area of Responsibility, the developing severe tropical storm was upgraded into a typhoon by the JMA, the JTWC, and by the PAGASA in their final bulletin for the system. As it emerged through the South China Sea, Saudel started to gradually weaken, and downgraded into a severe tropical storm. It moved westwards through the Gulf of Tonkin where increasingly unfavorable conditions made Saudel deteriorate rapidly on October 25. Saudel degenerated into a remnant low Quảng Bình Province in Vietnam.

As of October 24, the NDRRMC reported total damages of about ₱106 million (US$2.18 million).

=== Tropical Depression 20W ===
- Tropical depression (JMA)
- Tropical depression (SSHWS)
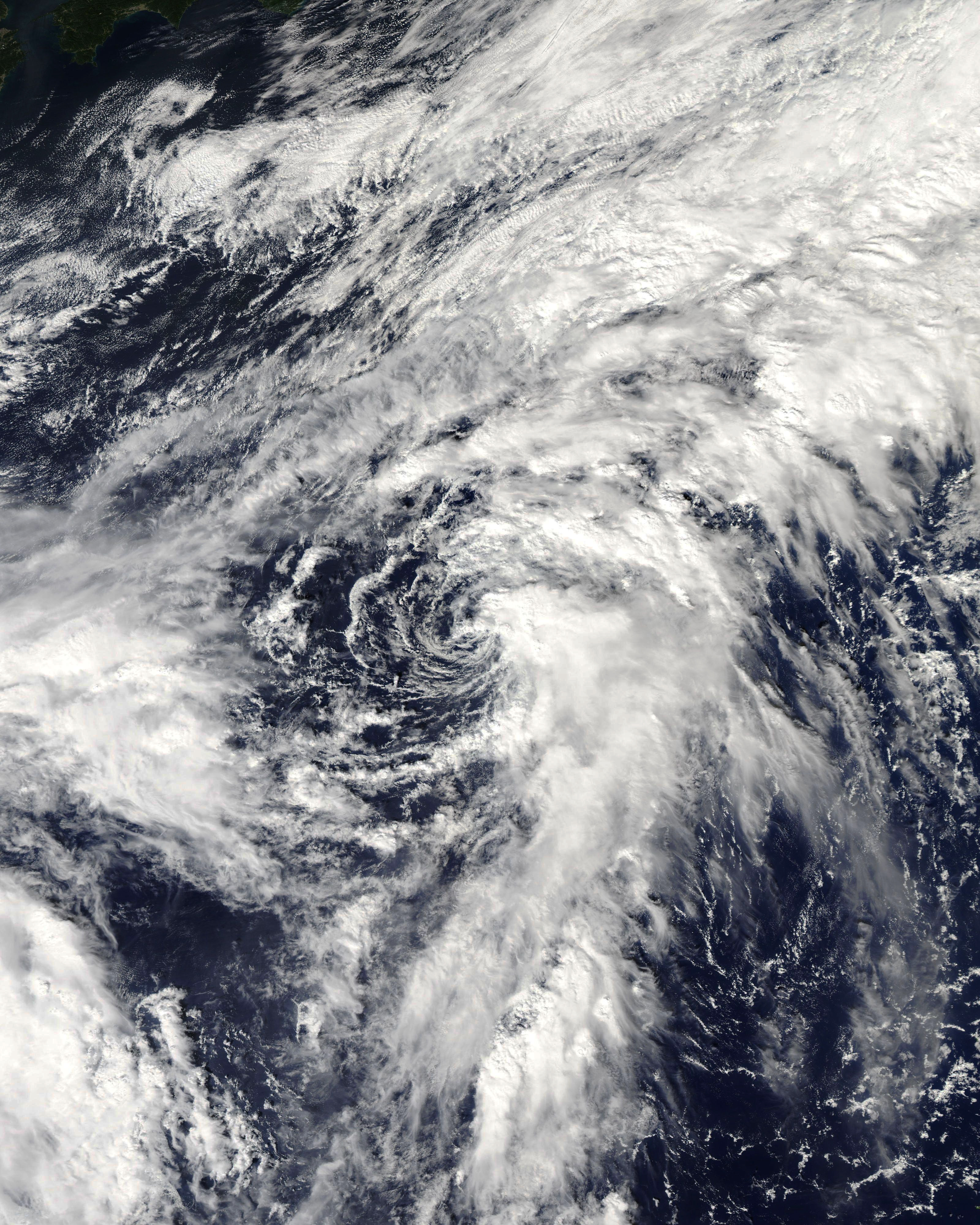
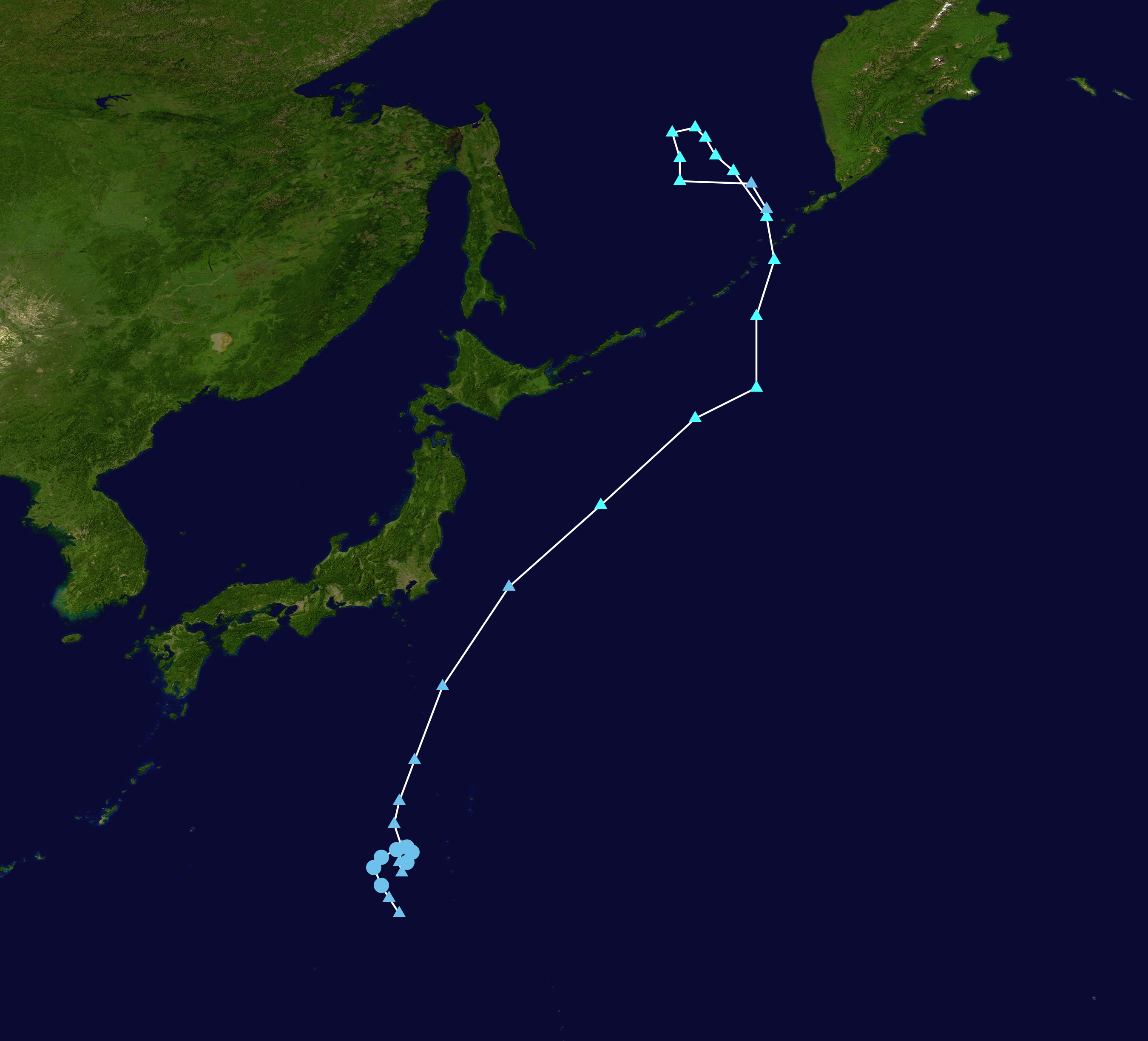
- Duration: October 19 – October 23
- Peak intensity: 55 km/h (35 mph) (10-min); 998 hPa (mbar)

On October 19, both the JMA and the JTWC began tracking a tropical depression, with the JTWC designating it as 20W. 20W formed over marginally favorable conditions for development, before turning southwest after originally moving northeastward, encountering strong wind shear. On October 21, the JTWC assessed that 20W was no longer a tropical depression, also assessing that it had transitioned into an extratropical cyclone the next day. The JMA stopped tracking 20W on October 23.

=== Typhoon Molave (Quinta) ===
- Very strong typhoon (JMA)
- Category 3 typhoon (SSHWS)
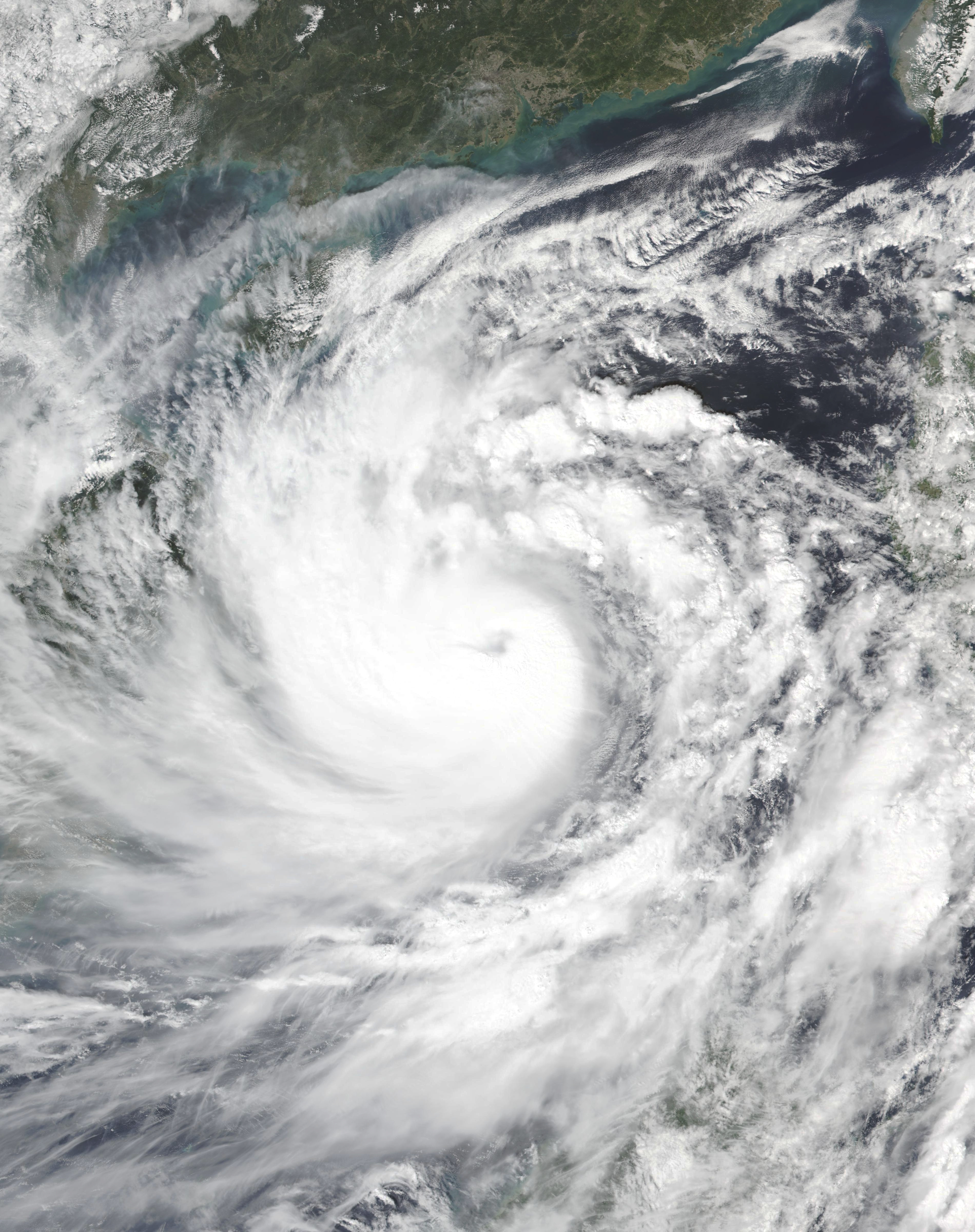
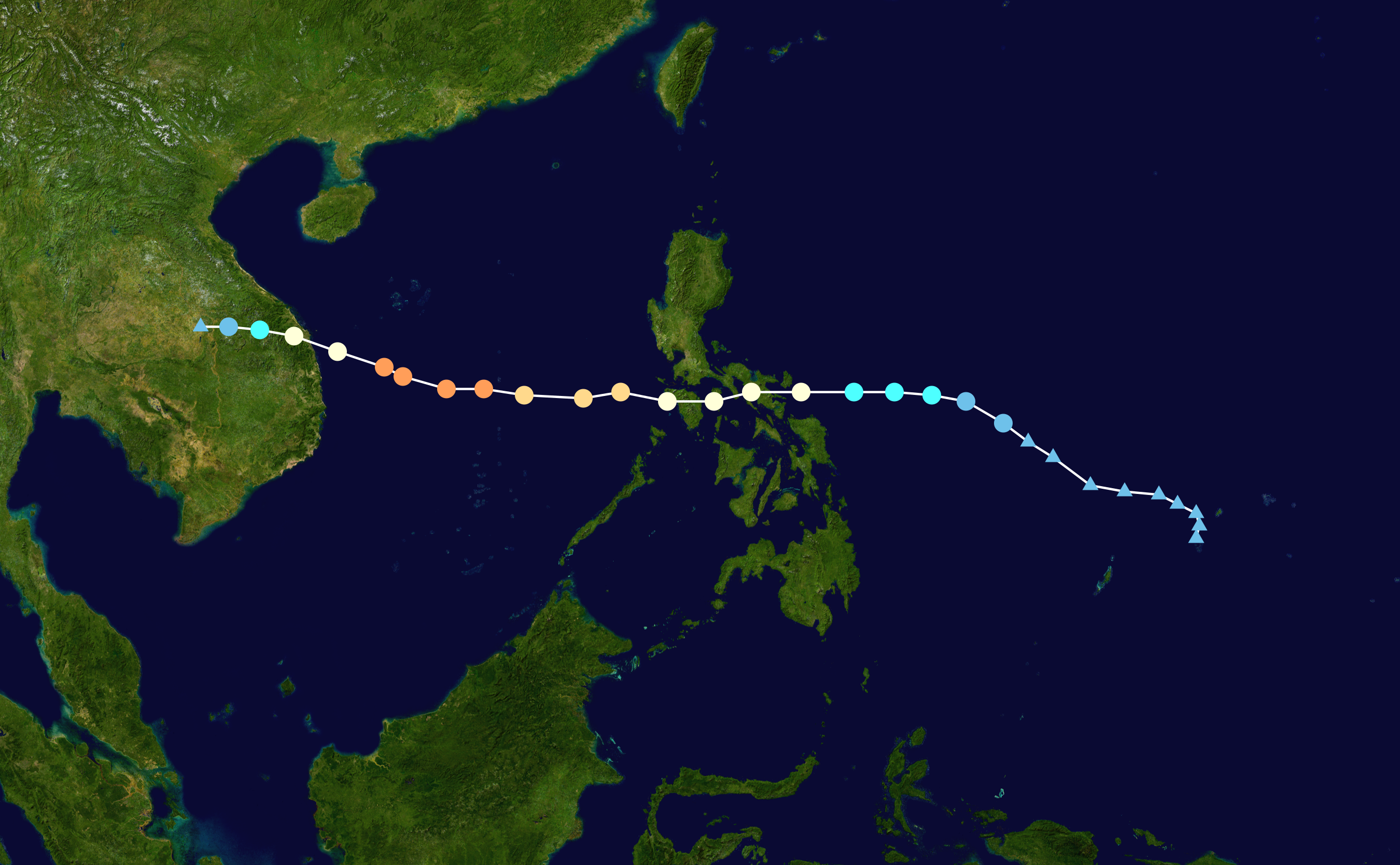
- Duration: October 22 – October 30
- Peak intensity: 165 km/h (105 mph) (10-min); 940 hPa (mbar)

On October 23, the JMA began tracking a tropical depression approximately 190 nautical miles (350 km) north of Palau. On the same day, PAGASA followed suit as the system formed inside of the Philippine Area of Responsibility (PAR), east of Mindanao, and named the system Quinta. JTWC followed suit and recognized as Tropical Depression 21W. Now a tropical storm, the system was named Molave by the JMA. As it nears over the Bicol Region, PAGASA later upgraded Molave into a severe tropical storm on October 25. Before landfall, all agencies were later upgraded to typhoon status, which prompted the warning for the province to Signal #3 in response to the approach of the typhoon. At 18:10 PHT (10:10 UTC), Molave made its first landfall in San Miguel Island in Albay, with another in Malinao just 40 minutes later. Molave made 3 more landfalls in San Andres, Quezon, Torrijos, Marinduque and Pola, Oriental Mindoro before entering the South China Sea on October 26. On October 27 at 00:00 UTC, Molave left the PAR, with PAGASA issuing their last bulletin for the system later at 15:00. Molave continue to intensify more and peaked as a Category-3 typhoon. As the system continued westwards, the storm began to slowly weaken as it approached Vietnam. Molave made landfall on Quảng Ngãi province, Central Vietnam at 10:10 UTC+7 (03:10 UTC), October 28 with category 2 typhoon strength. The storm rapidly weakened once inland, with the JTWC issuing their final warning on the system as the storm's convection became increasingly disorganized. The storm dissipated shortly afterward, over Myanmar.

As of November 9, 2020, the NDRRMC reported that 27 people were killed, 40 people were injured and four went missing after the typhoon. Damage from infrastructure and agriculture counted to be ₱1.56 billion (US$32.2 million) and ₱2.66 billion (US$55 million) respectively, with a total damage of ₱4.22 billion (US$87.2 million) nationwide.

=== Typhoon Goni (Rolly) ===
- Violent typhoon (JMA)
- Category 5 super typhoon (SSHWS)
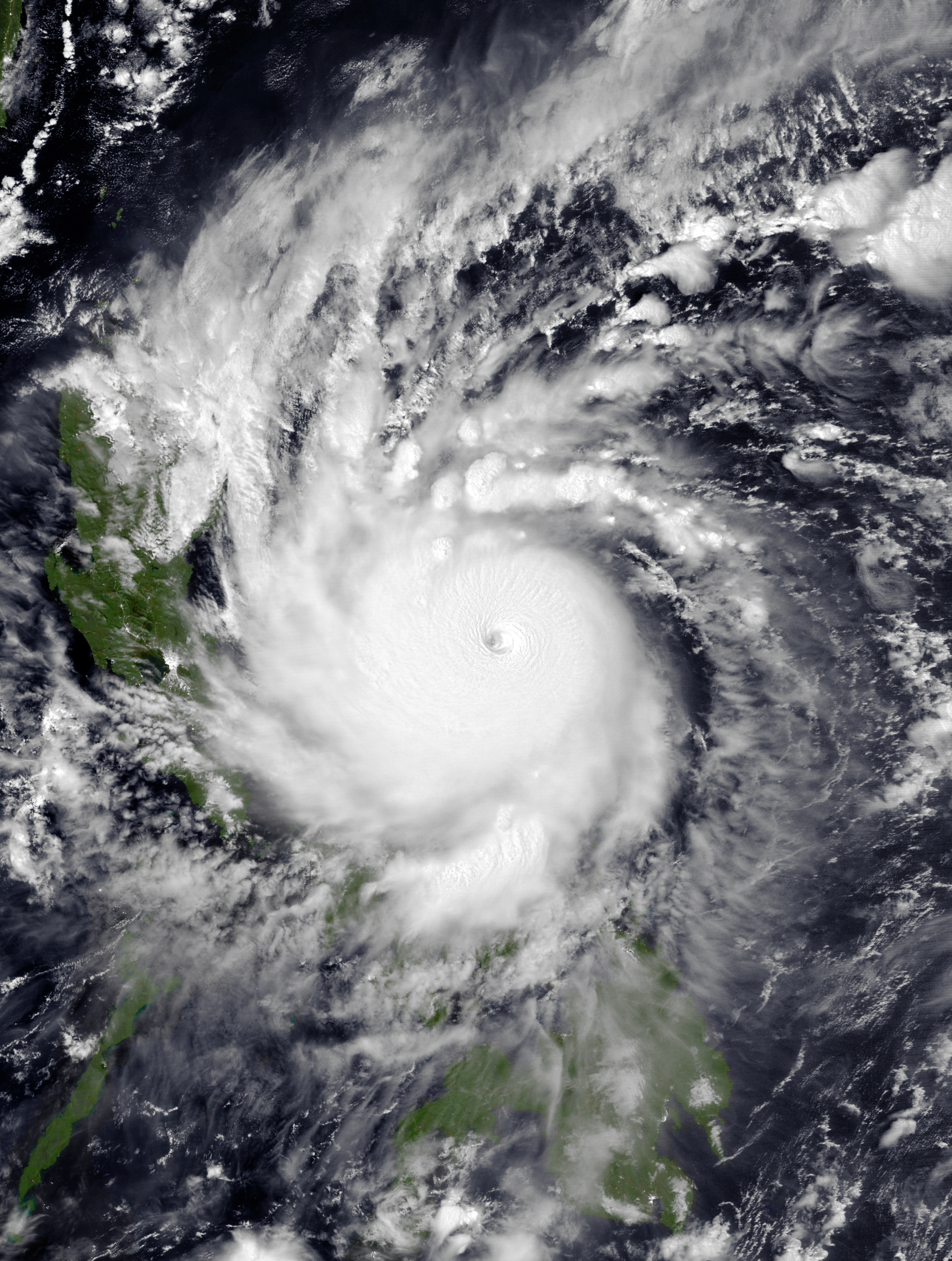
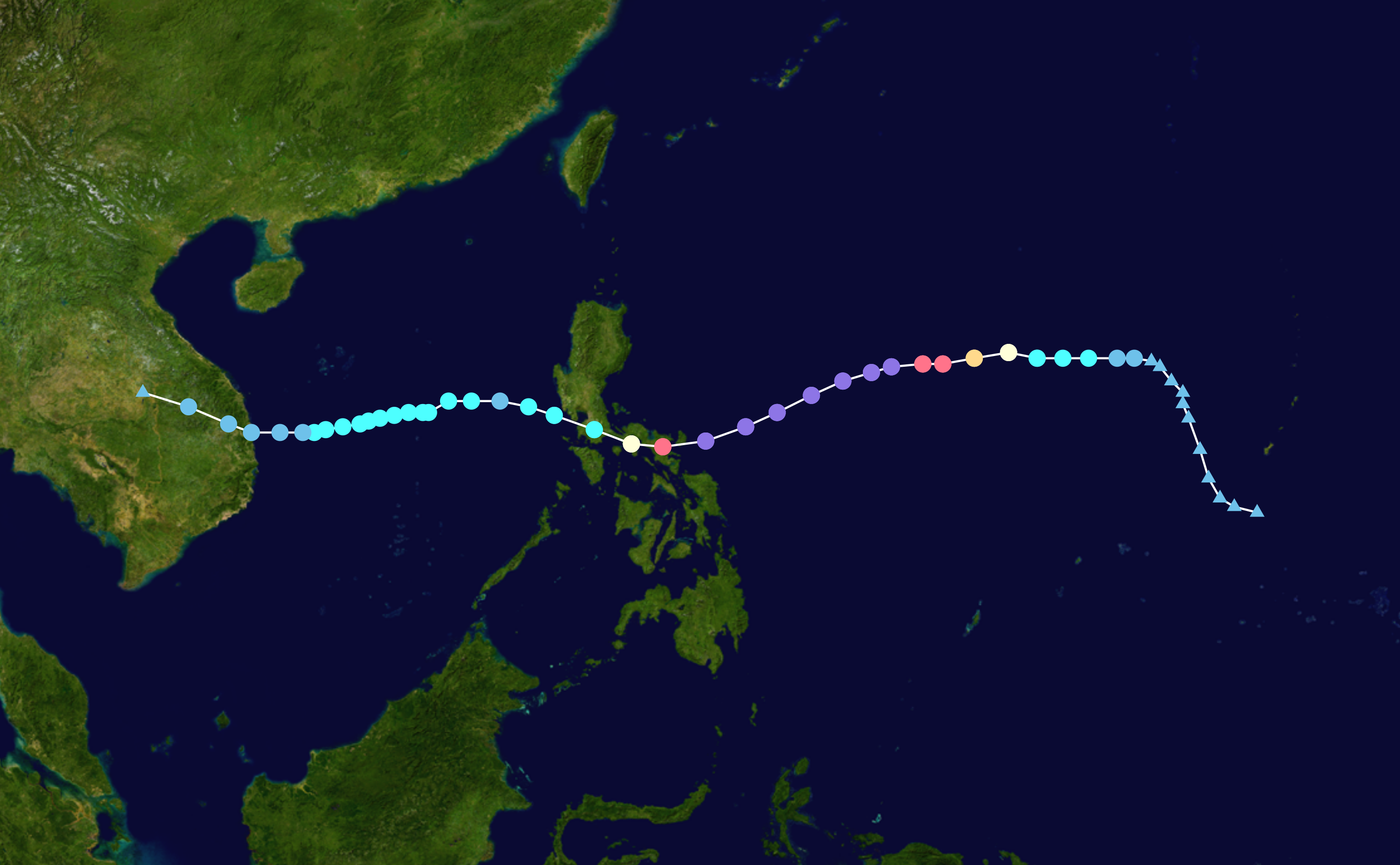
- Duration: October 26 – November 6
- Peak intensity: 220 km/h (140 mph) (10-min); 905 hPa (mbar)

After Typhoon Molave devastated the Philippines, the JMA announced the formation of a new tropical depression in the Pacific Ocean, west of the Mariana Islands, on October 27. By the next day, the JTWC had also followed and upgraded the system into a tropical depression. As the system continues to track westward under very favorable conditions, it reached tropical storm strength, naming it as Goni by the JMA. Rapid intensification was ensued and became a typhoon. On October 29, at 9:30 UTC, Goni entered the Philippine Area of Responsibility (PAR) and was named Rolly by the PAGASA. At the same day, Goni became the first Category-5 super typhoon with 10-minute winds of 220 kilometers per hour (140 mph) and 225 km/h (140 mph), respectively, marking the second time Tropical Cyclone Wind Signal #5 was raised by PAGASA since Typhoon Haima in 2016. Goni made its first two landfalls at peak intensity over Bato, Catanduanes (20:50 UTC) and Tiwi, Albay (23:20 UTC). After that, it weakened into a strong typhoon and made a third landfall in San Narciso, Quezon. Due to three landfalls and land interaction, Goni lost its immense strength and weakened into a minimal typhoon as it made a fourth landfall in San Juan, Batangas. Before exiting the PAR, Goni slightly intensified, but further development was hampered by unfavorable conditions. The capital, Manila, experienced some tropical storm-force winds from Goni.

As of November 11, 2020, the NDRRMC has reported ₱12.9 billion (US$266 million) of infrastructure damages, along with ₱5 billion (US$103 million) of agricultural damage, with a combined total of ₱17.9 billion (US$369 million), and at least 25 deaths, 399 injured and 6 missing. Goni is estimated to have caused at least ₱48.058 billion (US$1.04 billion) in damages in the Philippines.

=== Severe Tropical Storm Atsani (Siony) ===
- Severe tropical storm (JMA)
- Tropical storm (SSHWS)
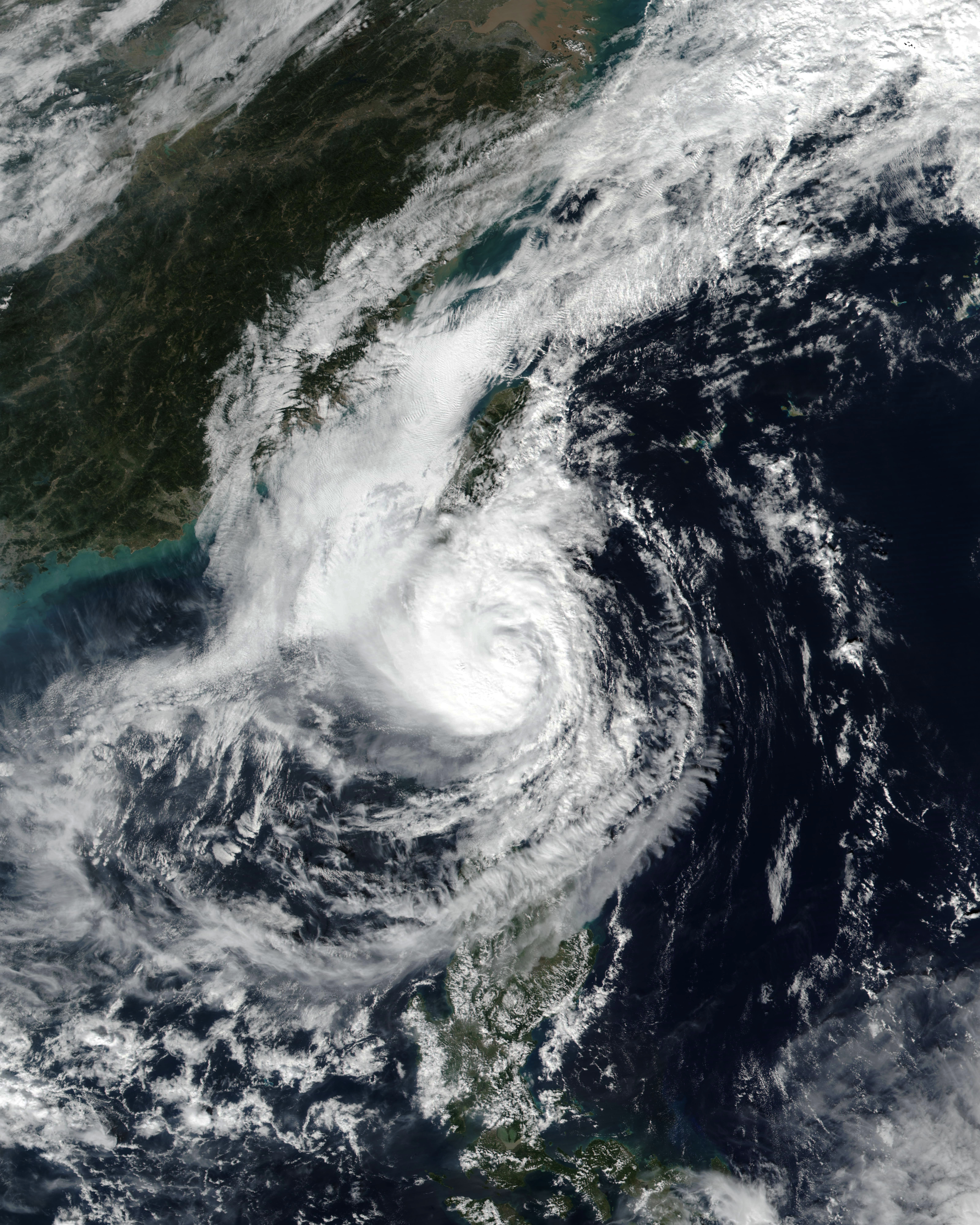
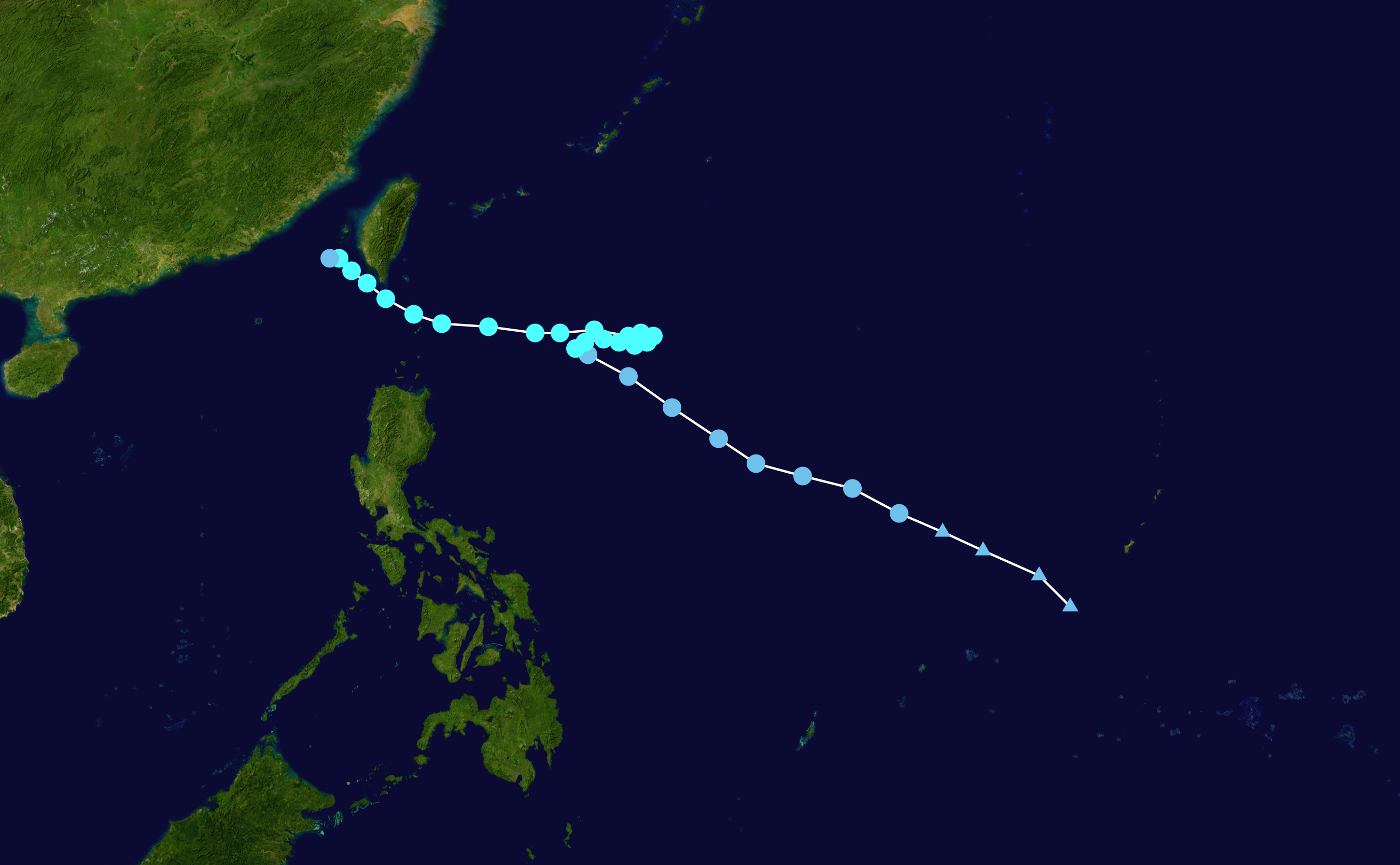
- Duration: October 30 – November 7
- Peak intensity: 95 km/h (60 mph) (10-min); 992 hPa (mbar)

On October 28, the JTWC began tracking another tropical disturbance 95 nautical miles (110 mi) south-southwest of Chuuk in the Federated States of Micronesia. This disturbance would eventually strengthen into a new tropical depression in the early hours of October 29. Later that day, the JMA upgraded the system into a tropical storm. On November 1, at 00:00 UTC, Atsani entered the PAGASA's Philippine Area of Responsibility (PAR), with the PAGASA naming the system Siony. The storm tracked northwest through the Philippine Sea, passing through the Luzon Strait on November 4. The system left the PAR on November 7 at 21:00 UTC. Shortly afterwards, the system rapidly weakened and dissipated thereafter.

Atsani downed trees, caused landslides, and damaged street lights in parts of Taiwan. Rockfalls caused some roads to close in Taitung County. 3 minor injuries were reported within Taitung County in the townships of Haiduan and Jinfeng. The storm brought heavy rains to Batanes and the Babuyan Islands in the Philippines, causing ₱4.9 million (US$102 thousand) in agricultural damage.

=== Tropical Storm Etau (Tonyo) ===
- Tropical storm (JMA)
- Tropical storm (SSHWS)
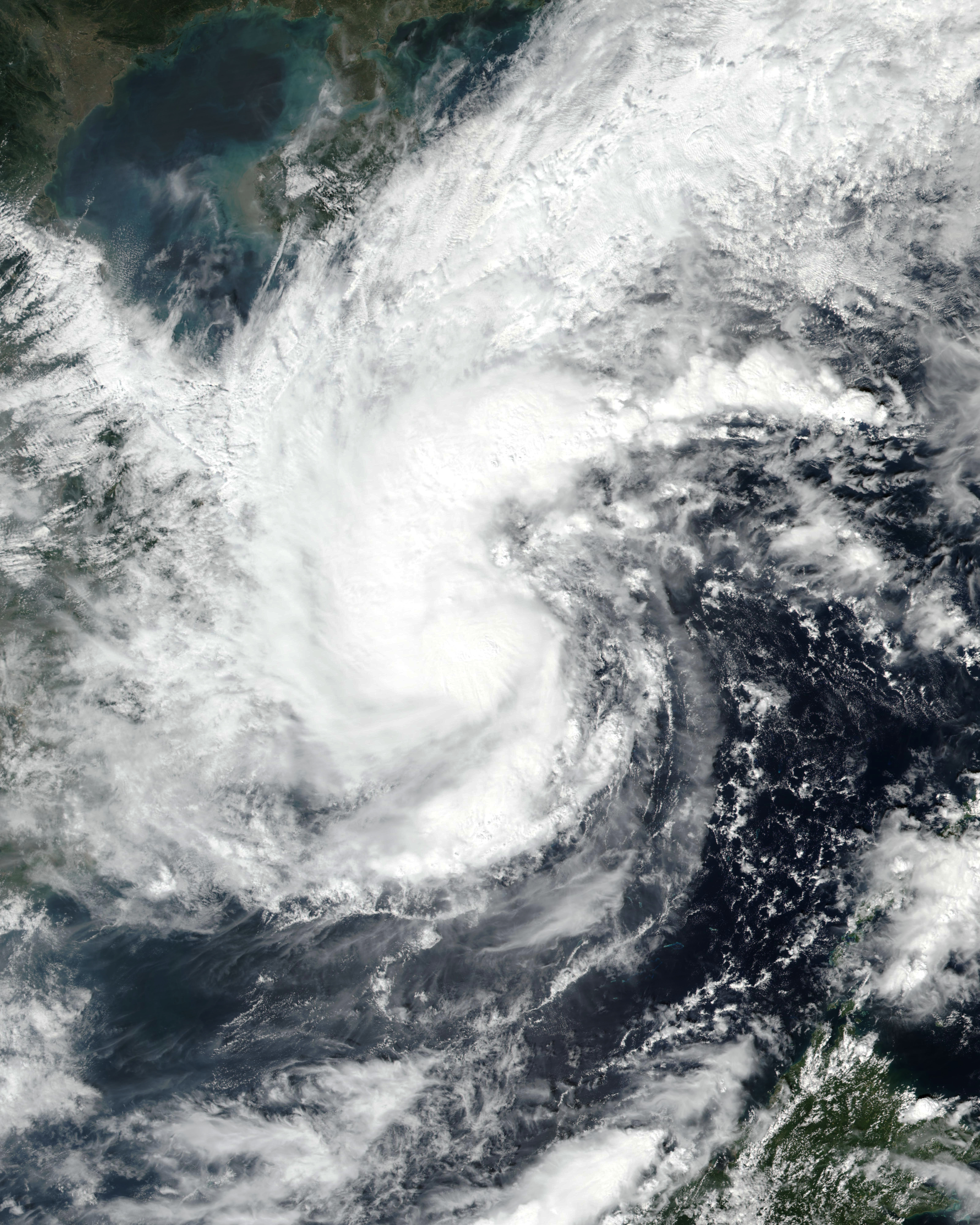
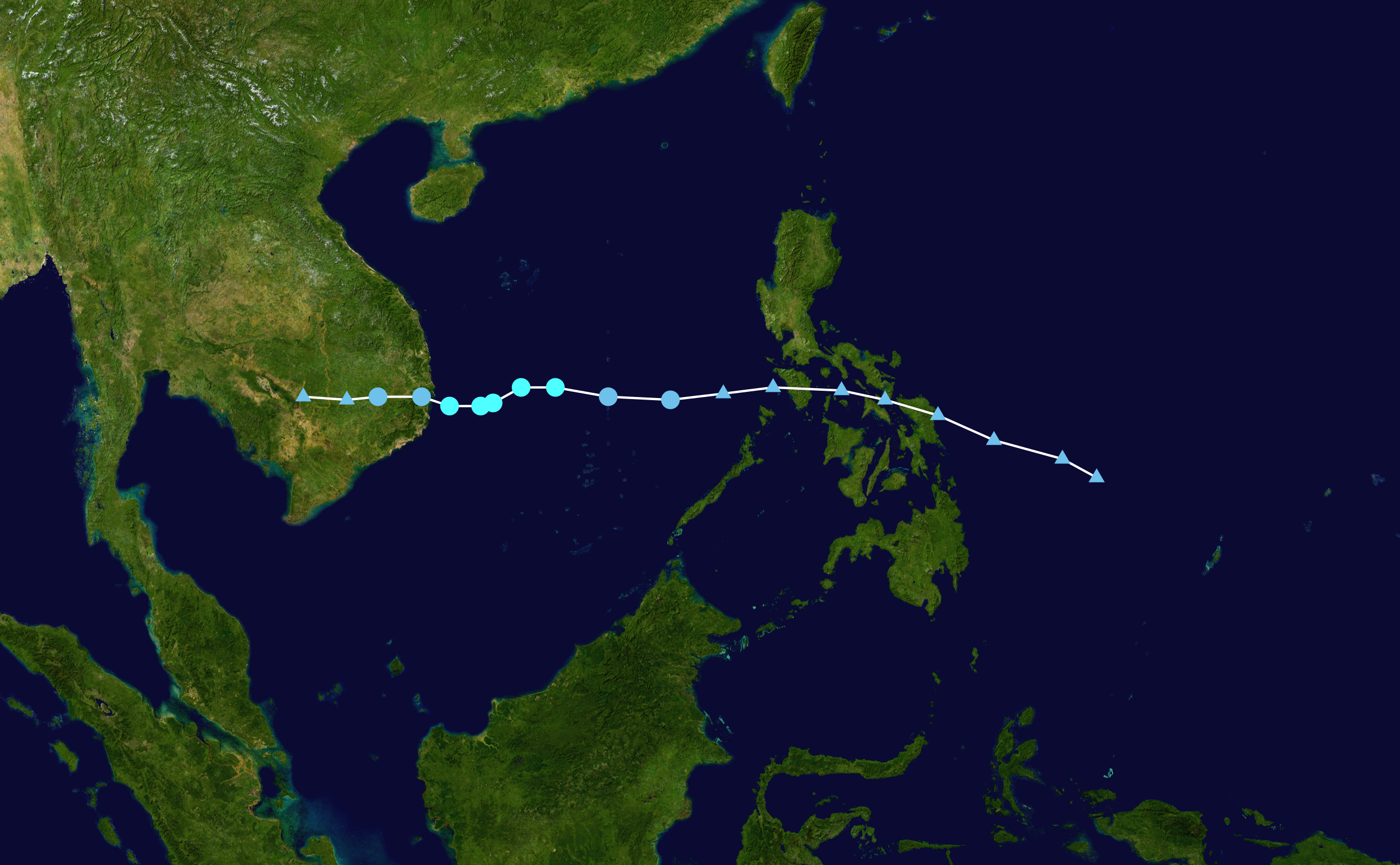
- Duration: November 6 – November 10
- Peak intensity: 85 km/h (50 mph) (10-min); 992 hPa (mbar)

On November 7, the Japan Meteorological Agency (JMA) began tracking a tropical depression 460 nautical miles (850 km; 530 mi) east-southeast of Manila. At 12:00 UTC on the same day, the PAGASA declared the system as a tropical depression and assigned it the name Tonyo as it formed directly over Burias Island. The Joint Typhoon Warning Center recognized the system as a tropical depression at 15:00 UTC on November 8. Etau caused rains over Calabarzon, Mimaropa, and the Bicol Region before exiting the Philippine Area of Responsibility on November 9 at 21:00 UTC. It continued its way towards Vietnam, after crossing Philippines.

Etau killed two people in Quảng Nam and Bình Định and damaged 400 houses when it made landfall in central Vietnam on November 10. The storm produced over 250 mm (9.8 in) of rain in the provinces of Bình Định, Khánh Hòa, and Phú Yên, with peak at 858 mm in Lake Thủy Yên (Thừa Thiên Huế). The storm also caused gusty winds which uprooted trees and ripped roofs of buildings, many of which were still recovering from the adverse impacts of Typhoon Molave and the weakened Tropical Storm Goni. In addition, power outages locally affected the city of Tuy Hòa. Economic losses in Tuy An, Phú Yên were counted as 122 billion VND (US$5.26 million).

=== Typhoon Vamco (Ulysses) ===
- Very strong typhoon (JMA)
- Category 4 typhoon (SSHWS)
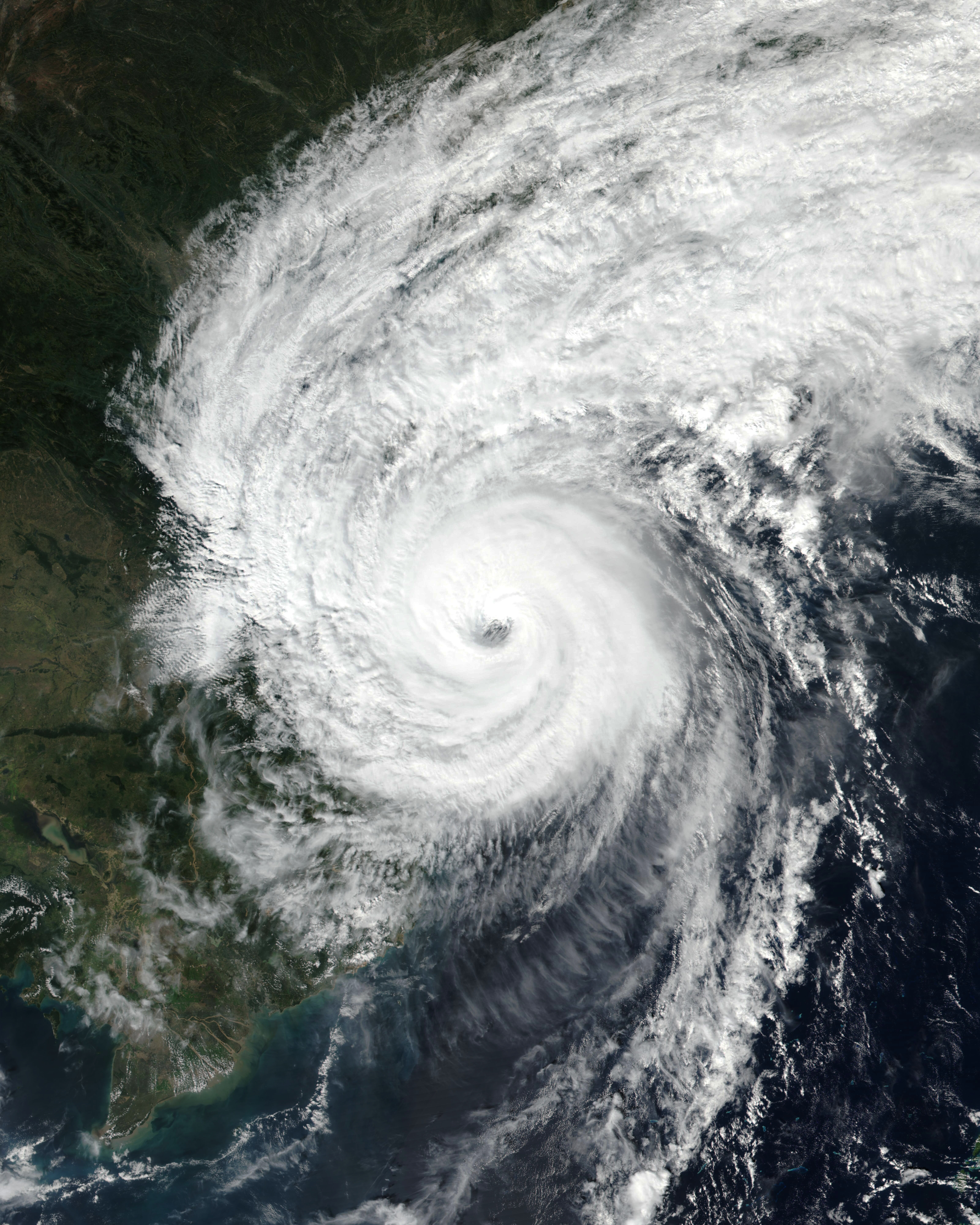
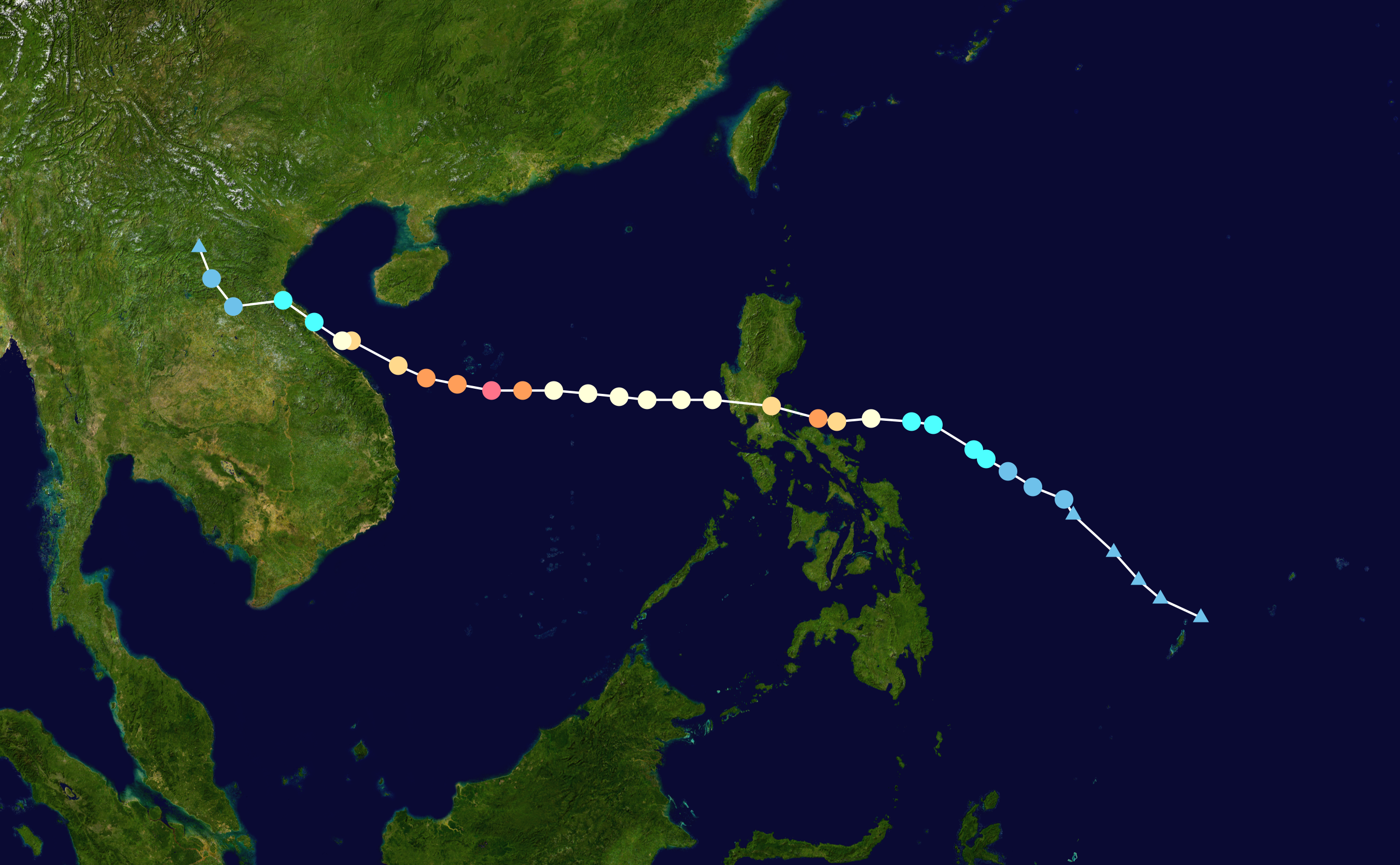
- Duration: November 8 – November 15
- Peak intensity: 165 km/h (105 mph) (10-min); 955 hPa (mbar)

On November 8, a tropical depression was formed around 132 nautical miles (245 km; 150 mi) north-northwest of Palau. At 12:00 UTC on the same day, the PAGASA declared the system as a tropical depression inside of the Philippine Area of Responsibility and named it Ulysses. The next day at 7:15 UTC, the system strengthened into a tropical storm, with the JMA giving it the name Vamco, with the Joint Typhoon Warning Center later issuing their first warning on the system designated as Tropical Depression 25W. As the system tracked closer to southern Luzon, Vamco was upgraded into a severe tropical storm. Vamco was then upgraded into typhoon status by the JMA on November 11, followed by the JTWC and later PAGASA, as the PAGASA raised Signal #3 tropical cyclone wind signals in preparation for the storm. At 14:30 UTC and 15:20 UTC, Vamco made its first two landfalls over the island towns of Patnanungan and Burdeos, respectively, both in Quezon Province. Later at 17:40 UTC, Vamco made its third landfall over General Nakar, Quezon, in the Luzon landmass. At 00:00 UTC, the system emerged over the western seaboard of Zambales and entered the South China Sea. The system left the PAR at 01:30 UTC as the PAGASA redeclared the system as a typhoon. Vamco rapidly re-strengthened in the South China Sea and peaked as a Category 4-equivalent typhoon briefly before weakening back into a Category 3-equivalent storm heading for Vietnam. The typhoon then weakened before making another landfall as a Category 1-equivalent typhoon in Vietnam.

As of January 13, 2021, the NDRRMC reported a total of 196 casualties (Including 101 validated deaths, 85 injuries and 10 missing) caused by the typhoon, along with ₱7.32 billion (US$151 million) worth of agriculture damages and ₱12.9 billion (US$267 million) worth of infrastructural damages. The Cagayan Valley experienced the highest total amount of damage. At least 5,184,824 individuals were affected by the typhoon's onslaught. According to Aon, total economic losses caused by the typhoon were estimated to top ₱50 billion (US$1 billion).

=== Tropical Storm Krovanh (Vicky) ===
- Tropical storm (JMA)
- Tropical depression (SSHWS)
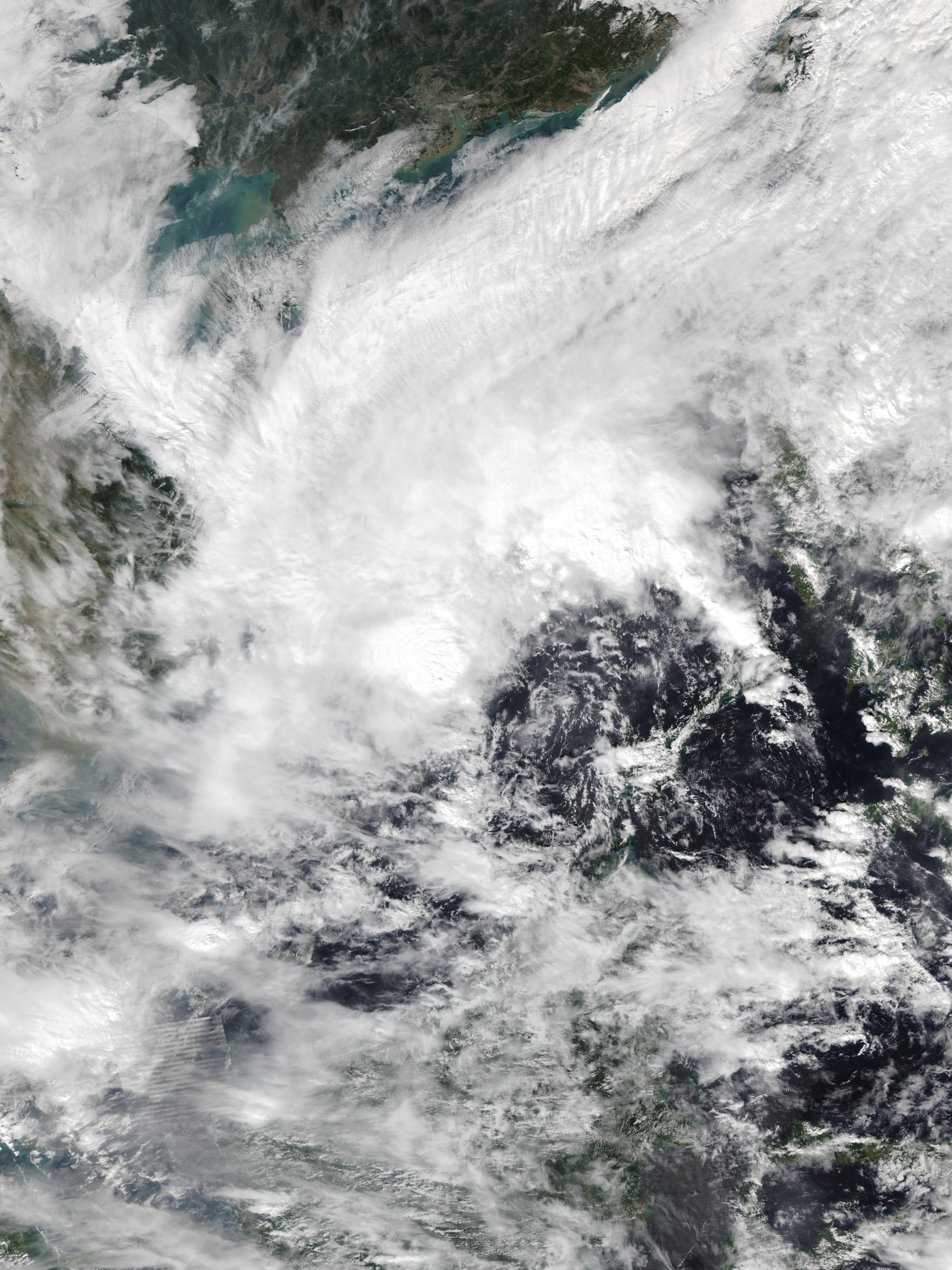
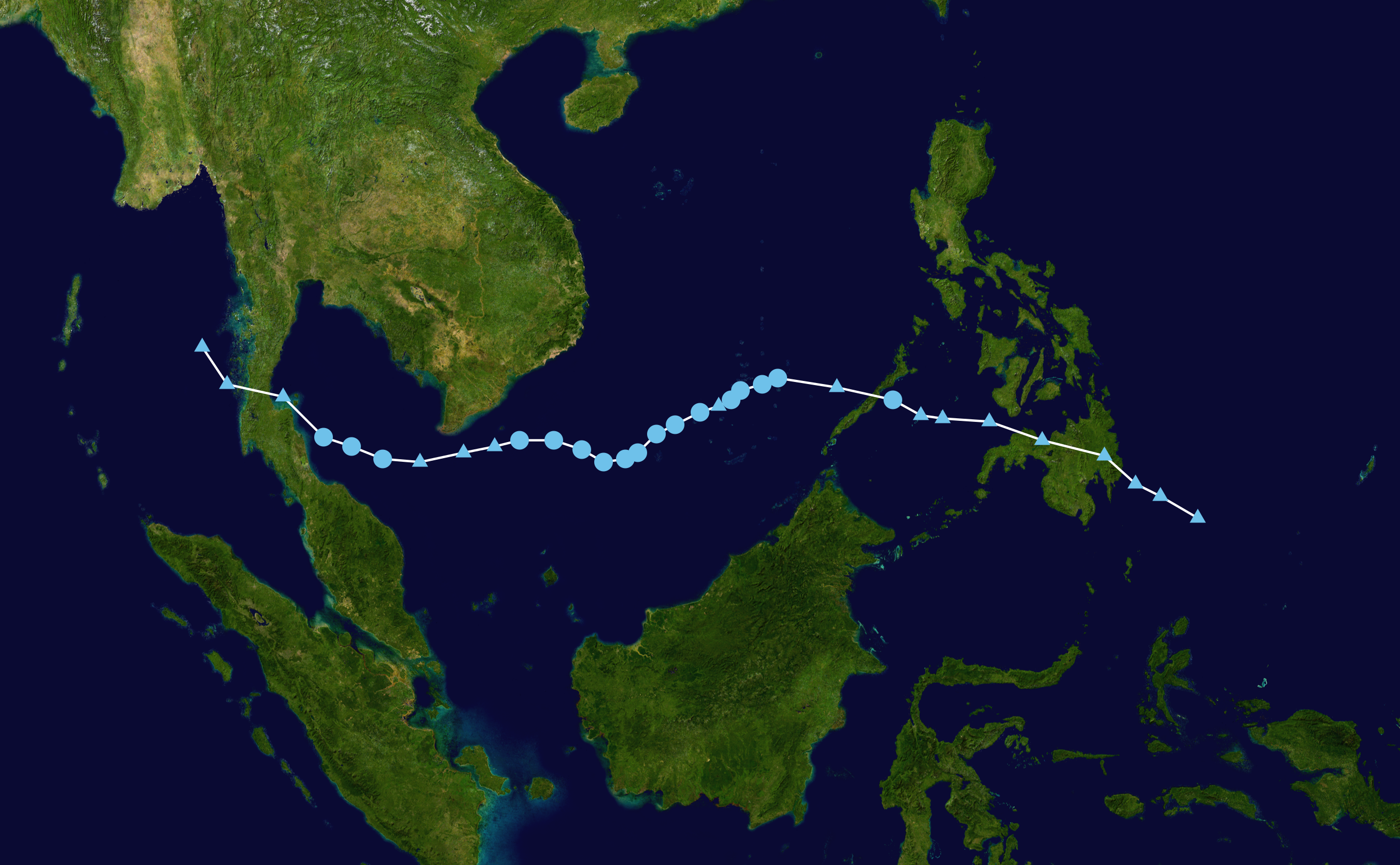
- Duration: December 18 – December 24
- Peak intensity: 65 km/h (40 mph) (10-min); 1000 hPa (mbar)

On December 17 at 21:00 UTC, the PAGASA began issuing bulletins for a system 140 nautical miles (260 km) east-southeast of Davao. The PAGASA had already recognized the system as a tropical depression and named it Vicky, however at the time, the Japan Meteorological Agency (JMA) only recognized the system as a low-pressure area. The next day, the JMA followed suit and recognized the system as a tropical depression. At 14:00 PHT (6:00 UTC), the system made landfall in Baganga, Davao Oriental. 9 hours later, it emerged off the coast of Misamis Oriental and entered the Bohol Sea, later entering the Sulu Sea on the next day at 5:00 PHT (23:00 UTC). On December 19 at 23:00 PHT (15:00 UTC), Krovanh made its second landfall over central Palawan, emerging into the South China Sea shortly after. As the storm traversed the South China Sea, the system had strengthened into a tropical storm according to the JMA as it emerged into a region of relatively favorable atmospheric conditions, thus given the name Krovanh. On December 20 at 14:00 PHT (6:00 UTC), Krovanh left the Philippine Area of Responsibility, although storm signals were still raised for the Kalayaan Islands. The PAGASA then upgraded Krovanh into a tropical storm, and issued a Signal No. 2 warning for the Kalayaan Islands. The next day, December 21, Krovanh was downgraded into a tropical depression by both the JMA and by the PAGASA in their final advisories for the storm. The JTWC then issued their final warning on Krovanh the next day shortly after most of its central convection had dissipated due to increasingly hostile wind shear.

Large swaths of Visayas and Mindanao were placed under Signal No. 1 warnings due to Krovanh. Floods and landslides were triggered in Cebu, Agusan del Sur, Davao de Oro, and in Leyte, where two senior citizens were killed in a landslide. In Lapu-Lapu City, 300 residents were forced to evacuate after 76 houses near the shore were swept into sea. Around 6,702 individuals were affected by the storm in the Philippines, with 5,646 in evacuation centers. Damages have been estimated to total up to ₱214 million (US$4.45 million). At least nine people were killed by the effects of Krovanh.

=== Other systems ===
- Late on July 27, the JMA began to track a weak tropical depression in the open Western Pacific. Later the next day, the system would be classified as a subtropical depression by the JTWC, having been given a low chance of transitioning to a tropical cyclone. In a marginal environment with cyclonic easterly flow, moderate to strong wind shear and 28–30 °C sea surface temperatures, the system was expected to recurve poleward and be absorbed by a larger extratropical low. Instead, it dissipated on July 30.
- The JMA began monitoring a tropical depression south of Japan on September 27. The system moved generally northeastward until it was last noted on 18:00 UTC on September 29.
- On December 5, a tropical depression formed south of Japan. The depression would be short-lived, as it dissipated the next day after being embedded into a frontal zone.
- On December 29, the JMA tracked a weak tropical depression east of Vietnam.

== Storm names ==
Within the Northwest Pacific Ocean, both the Japan Meteorological Agency (JMA) and the Philippine Atmospheric, Geophysical and Astronomical Services Administration (PAGASA) assign names to tropical cyclones that develop in the Western Pacific, which can result in a tropical cyclone having two names. The Japan Meteorological Agency's RSMC Tokyo – Typhoon Center assigns international names to tropical cyclones on behalf of the World Meteorological Organization's Typhoon Committee, should they be judged to have 10-minute sustained windspeeds of 65 km/h (40 mph). PAGASA assigns names to tropical cyclones which move into or form as a tropical depression in their area of responsibility located between 135°E and 115°E and between 5°N and 25°N even if the cyclone has had an international name assigned to it. The names of significant tropical cyclones are retired, by both PAGASA and the Typhoon Committee. Should the list of names for the Philippine region be exhausted then names will be taken from an auxiliary list of which the first ten are published each season. Unused names are marked in gray.

=== International names ===
During the season, 23 tropical storms developed in the Western Pacific and each one was named by the JMA, when the system was judged to have 10-minute sustained windspeeds of 65 kilometers per hour (40 mph). The JMA selected the names from a list of 140 names, that had been developed by the 14 members nations and territories of the ESCAP/WMO Typhoon Committee. During the season, the name Saudel was used for the first time after it replaced Soudelor, which was retired following the 2015 season.

Vongfong	Nuri	Sinlaku	Hagupit	Jangmi	Mekkhala	Higos	Bavi	Maysak	Haishen	Noul	Dolphin
Kujira	Chan-hom	Linfa	Nangka	Saudel	Molave	Goni	Atsani	Etau	Vamco	Krovanh	

==== Retirement ====
At their 53rd and 54th session in February 2021, the ESCAP/WMO Typhoon Committee announced that the names Vongfong, Linfa, Molave, Goni, and Vamco would be removed from the naming lists due to the number of deaths and amount of damages each one caused in their respective onslaughts, and they will never be used again for another typhoon name. In February 2022, they were replaced by Penha, Peilou, Narra, Gaenari and Bang-Lang respectively.

=== Philippines ===
Main list
Ambo	Butchoy	Carina	Dindo	Enteng
Ferdie	Gener	Helen	Igme	Julian
Kristine	Leon	Marce	Nika	Ofel
Pepito	Quinta	Rolly	Siony	Tonyo
Ulysses	Vicky	Warren (unused)	Yoyong (unused)	Zosimo (unused)
Auxiliary list
Alakdan (unused)	Baldo (unused)	Clara (unused)	Dencio (unused)	Estong (unused)
Felipe (unused)	Gomer (unused)	Heling (unused)	Ismael (unused)	Julio (unused)

During the season PAGASA used its own naming scheme for the 22 tropical cyclones, that either developed within or moved into their self-defined area of responsibility. This is the same list used during the 2016 season, except for the names Kristine, Leon and Nika, which replaced Karen, Lawin and Nina, respectively. All three names were used for the first time, as well as the names Pepito and Vicky (which replaced Pablo and Violeta in 2012 and 2004 respectively, but went unused in previous seasons).

==== Retirement ====
After the season, PAGASA announced that the names Ambo, Quinta, Rolly and Ulysses will be removed from its rotating naming lists due to the number of deaths and amount of damage they caused, and they will not be used again. On January 21, 2021, they were replaced with Aghon, Querubin, Romina and Upang respectively. These new names first appeared in the 2024 season.

== Season effects ==
This table summarizes all the systems that developed within or moved into the North Pacific Ocean, to the west of the International Date Line during 2020. The tables also provide an overview of a system's intensity, duration, land areas affected and any deaths or damages associated with the system.

Name	Dates	Peak intensity			Areas affected	Damage (USD)	Deaths	Ref(s).
Name	Dates	Category	Wind speed	Pressure	Areas affected	Damage (USD)	Deaths	Ref(s).
Vongfong (Ambo)	May 8–18	Very strong typhoon	155 km/h (95 mph)	960 hPa (28.35 inHg)	Palau, Philippines, Taiwan	$50 million	5	
Nuri (Butchoy)	June 10–14	Tropical storm	75 km/h (45 mph)	996 hPa (29.41 inHg)	Philippines, South China	Unknown	1	
Carina	July 11–15	Tropical depression	Not specified	1004 hPa (29.65 inHg)	Philippines, Taiwan	Minimal	None	
TD	July 27–29	Tropical depression	Not specified	1010 hPa (29.83 inHg)	None	None	None	
Hagupit (Dindo)	July 30 – August 5	Typhoon	130 km/h (80 mph)	975 hPa (28.79 inHg)	Ryukyu Islands, Taiwan, East China, Korean Peninsula, Kamchatka Peninsula	$1.5 billion	17	
Sinlaku	July 31 – August 3	Tropical storm	75 km/h (45 mph)	985 hPa (29.09 inHg)	South China, Vietnam, Laos, Thailand, Myanmar	$12.9 million	4	
Jangmi (Enteng)	August 6–11	Tropical storm	85 km/h (55 mph)	994 hPa (29.35 inHg)	Philippines, Ryukyu Islands, Korean Peninsula	$1 million	None	
06W (Gener)	August 8–13	Tropical depression	55 km/h (35 mph)	1012 hPa (29.88 inHg)	Bonin Islands, Ryukyu Islands	None	None	
Mekkhala (Ferdie)	August 9–11	Severe tropical storm	95 km/h (60 mph)	992 hPa (29.29 inHg)	Philippines, Taiwan, East China	$159 million	None	
Higos (Helen)	August 16–20	Severe tropical storm	100 km/h (60 mph)	992 hPa (29.29 inHg)	Philippines, South China, Northern Vietnam	$143 million	7	
Bavi (Igme)	August 20–27	Very strong typhoon	155 km/h (95 mph)	950 hPa (28.05 inHg)	Philippines, Ryukyu Islands, Taiwan, Korean Peninsula, North China	$11.7 million	1	
Maysak (Julian)	August 27 – September 3	Very strong typhoon	175 km/h (110 mph)	935 hPa (27.61 inHg)	Philippines, Japan, Korean Peninsula, Northeast China	$100 million	46	
Haishen (Kristine)	August 30 – September 7	Violent typhoon	195 km/h (120 mph)	910 hPa (26.87 inHg)	Mariana Islands, Northeast China, Japan, Korean Peninsula	$100 million	4	
12W	September 10–12	Tropical depression	55 km/h (35 mph)	1006 hPa (29.71 inHg)	Japan	None	None	
Noul (Leon)	September 14–18	Tropical storm	85 km/h (55 mph)	994 hPa (29.35 inHg)	Laos, Thailand, Myanmar, Philippines, Vietnam, Cambodia	$175 million	18	
Dolphin (Marce)	September 19–24	Severe tropical storm	110 km/h (70 mph)	975 hPa (28.79 inHg)	None	None	None	
Kujira	September 25–30	Severe tropical storm	110 km/h (70 mph)	980 hPa (28.94 inHg)	None	None	None	
TD	September 27–29	Tropical depression	Not specified	1000 hPa (29.53 inHg)	None	None	None	
Chan-hom	October 4–17	Typhoon	130 km/h (80 mph)	965 hPa (28.64 inHg)	Japan	None	None	
Linfa	October 6–12	Tropical storm	85 km/h (55 mph)	994 hPa (29.35 inHg)	Philippines, Vietnam, Cambodia, Laos, Thailand, Myanmar	$217 million	138	
Nangka (Nika)	October 11–14	Tropical storm	85 km/h (55 mph)	990 hPa (29.23 inHg)	Philippines, South China, Vietnam, Laos, Myanmar	$29.4 million	4	
Ofel	October 13–16	Tropical depression	45 km/h (30 mph)	1002 hPa (29.59 inHg)	Philippines, Vietnam, Laos	$187,000	10	
Saudel (Pepito)	October 18–25	Typhoon	120 km/h (75 mph)	975 hPa (28.79 inHg)	Philippines, South China, Vietnam	$15.2 million	None	
20W	October 19–23	Tropical depression	55 km/h (35 mph)	998 hPa (29.47 inHg)	None	None	None	
Molave (Quinta)	October 22–30	Very strong typhoon	165 km/h (105 mph)	940 hPa (27.76 inHg)	Philippines, Spratly Island, Vietnam, Laos, Cambodia, Thailand, Malaysia, Myanmar	$742 million	71	
Goni (Rolly)	October 26 – November 6	Violent typhoon	220 km/h (135 mph)	905 hPa (26.72 inHg)	Philippines, Vietnam, Cambodia, Laos	$1.02 billion	32	
Atsani (Siony)	October 30 – November 7	Severe tropical storm	95 km/h (60 mph)	992 hPa (29.29 inHg)	Mariana Islands, Philippines, Taiwan, South China	$102,000	None	
Etau (Tonyo)	November 6–10	Tropical storm	85 km/h (55 mph)	992 hPa (29.29 inHg)	Philippines, Vietnam, Cambodia	$34.8 million	3	
Vamco (Ulysses)	November 8–15	Very strong typhoon	155 km/h (95 mph)	955 hPa (28.20 inHg)	Philippines, Vietnam, Laos, Thailand	$1.06 billion	102	
TD	December 5–6	Tropical depression	Not specified	1010 hPa (29.83 inHg)	None	None	None	
Krovanh (Vicky)	December 18–24	Tropical storm	65 km/h (40 mph)	1000 hPa (29.53 inHg)	Philippines, Malaysia, Thailand	$4.48 million	9	
TD	December 29	Tropical depression	Not specified	1004 hPa (29.65 inHg)	None	None	None	
Season aggregates
32 systems	May 8 – December 29, 2020		220 km/h (140 mph)	905 hPa (26.72 inHg)		$5.35 billion	472	

== See also ==
- Weather of 2020
- Tropical cyclones in 2020
- Pacific typhoon season
- List of wettest tropical cyclones
- 2020 Atlantic hurricane season
- 2020 Pacific hurricane season
- 2020 North Indian Ocean cyclone season
- South-West Indian Ocean cyclone seasons: 2019–20, 2020–21
- Australian region cyclone seasons: 2019–20, 2020–21
- South Pacific cyclone seasons: 2019–20, 2020–21
