= 2020 Central Vietnam floods =

Series of severe rainfall and floods in Central Vietnam in 2020

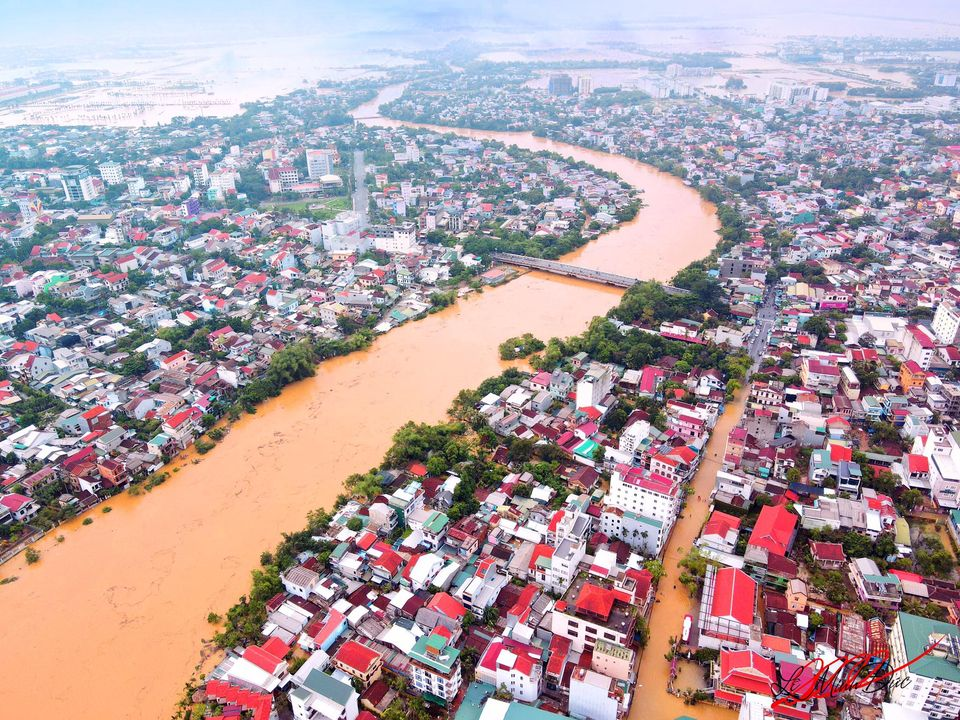
- Floods over Hương River in central Huế on 10 October 2020
- Date: 5 October 2020 – 21 November 2020 (1 month, 2 weeks, 2 days)
- Location: Central Vietnam, Cambodia and Laos
- Cause: Monsoon season and 9 tropical cyclones: Unnamed tropical depression: 5 October – 8 October; Tropical Storm Linfa: 9 October – 12 October; Tropical Storm Nangka: 11 October – 16 October; Tropical Depression Ofel: 13 October – 18 October; Typhoon Saudel: 24 October – 26 October; Typhoon Molave: 27 October – 29 October; Typhoon Goni: 5 November – 7 November; Tropical Storm Etau: 9 November – 11 November; Typhoon Vamco: 14 November – 16 November
- Deaths: 189 deaths, 60 missing (in Vietnam, as of 15 November); 44 deaths (in Cambodia)
- Property damage: đ35.8 trillion (US$1.57 billion)

The 2020 Central Vietnam floods were a series of floods in Central Vietnam, which also affected some areas in Cambodia and Laos in October and early November 2020. The floods focused heavily in several provinces including Thừa Thiên Huế, Hà Tĩnh, Quảng Bình, Quảng Trị, and Quảng Ngãi. The floods were mainly caused by the seasonal monsoon, with additional impact from multiple tropical cyclones.

Beginning on 7 October, amid seasonal monsoon conditions and tropical depressions over Khánh Hòa province, a series of tropical cyclones during the 2020 Pacific typhoon season, including Linfa, Nangka, Ofel, Saudel, and Molave, affected Northern and Central Vietnam, as well as parts of Laos and Cambodia. The storms brought strong winds and excessive rainfall to the affected regions, with precipitation peaking at 3,245 mm (127.76 inches) in Hướng Linh, Hướng Hóa District, Quảng Trị around 20 October. In response to the severe flooding, Vietnam issued a Category IV disaster alert for heavy rainfall—the first time this highest-level warning had ever been declared, surpassing the previous maximum of Category III.

On 5 November, the weakening Typhoon Goni entered the South China Sea and made landfall in Central Vietnam the day after as a tropical depression. On 10 November, Tropical Storm Etau also made landfall in the same region. On 12 November, Typhoon Vamco entered the South China Sea, approaching Vietnam as it gradually strengthened into Category 4-equivalent strength after exiting the Philippine Area of Responsibility.

As of 1 December, more than 243 people were reported dead or missing by the Vietnam Disaster Management Authority (VNDMA) as a result of the floods. The total economic damage the floods caused was nearly đ35.8 trillion (US$1.57 billion).

== Impact ==
=== Seasonal monsoon associated with low-pressure area (6–9 October) ===
On 7 October, a low-pressure area made landfall in the provinces of the South Central Coast. Enhanced by the seasonal northeast monsoon, many provinces nearby experienced heavy rainfall with average accumulations ranging from 200 to 300 mm. In Sa Huỳnh (Quảng Ngãi), rainfall peaked at 360 mm (14.17 inches). By 11 October, prior to the landfall of Tropical Storm Linfa, heavy floods had already killed nine people.

=== Tropical Storm Linfa ===
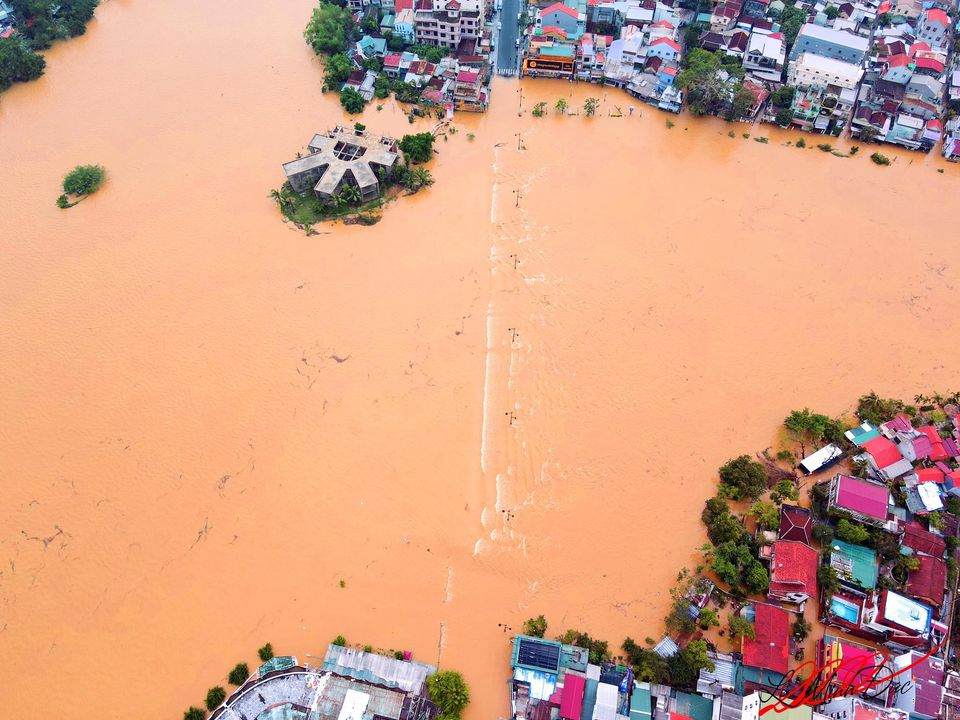
Đập Đá Bridge in Huế after flooding on 10 October 2020.

On 9 October, a tropical depression formed in the east of Luzon. It was upgraded to a tropical storm and was named Linfa by the Japan Meteorological Agency (JMA) the next day. On 11 October, Linfa made landfall along Vietnam's Central Coast in Quảng Ngãi province— an area already flooded by monsoonal flooding from 6 to 9 October. It delivered historic levels of rainfall to Central Vietnam, with accumulations peaking at 2,290 mm (90.16 inches) in A Lưới (Thừa Thiên Huế) and 1,520 mm (59.84 inches) in Hướng Linh (Quảng Trị), making Linfa the twelfth-wettest tropical cyclone on record.

The storm destroyed 382 houses and flooded an additional 109,034. In addition, the storm damaged 165.1 km of national highways and 140.1 km of provincial roads. Agricultural losses were severe, with 584 hectares (1,440 acres) of rice crops, 3,879 hectares (9,590 acres) of vegetable crops, and 2,141 hectares (5,290 acres) of aquaculture areas destroyed. An estimated 150,700 cattle and poultry were lost. In total, Linfa left 174 people dead and 20 people missing in Vietnam and Cambodia.

==== Rào Trăng 3 landslides ====
On the night of 11 October, heavy rainfall associated with Tropical Storm Linfa triggered a landslide at the Rào Trăng 3 Hydropower Plant in Phong Điền District, Thừa Thiên Huế Province, leaving 17 construction workers missing. On 12 October, a military rescue team was dispatched to search for the missing workers was struck by a second landslide, killing Major General Nguyễn Văn Man and 12 other soldiers. Their bodies were recovered by rescuers on 15 October.

=== Tropical Storm Nangka ===
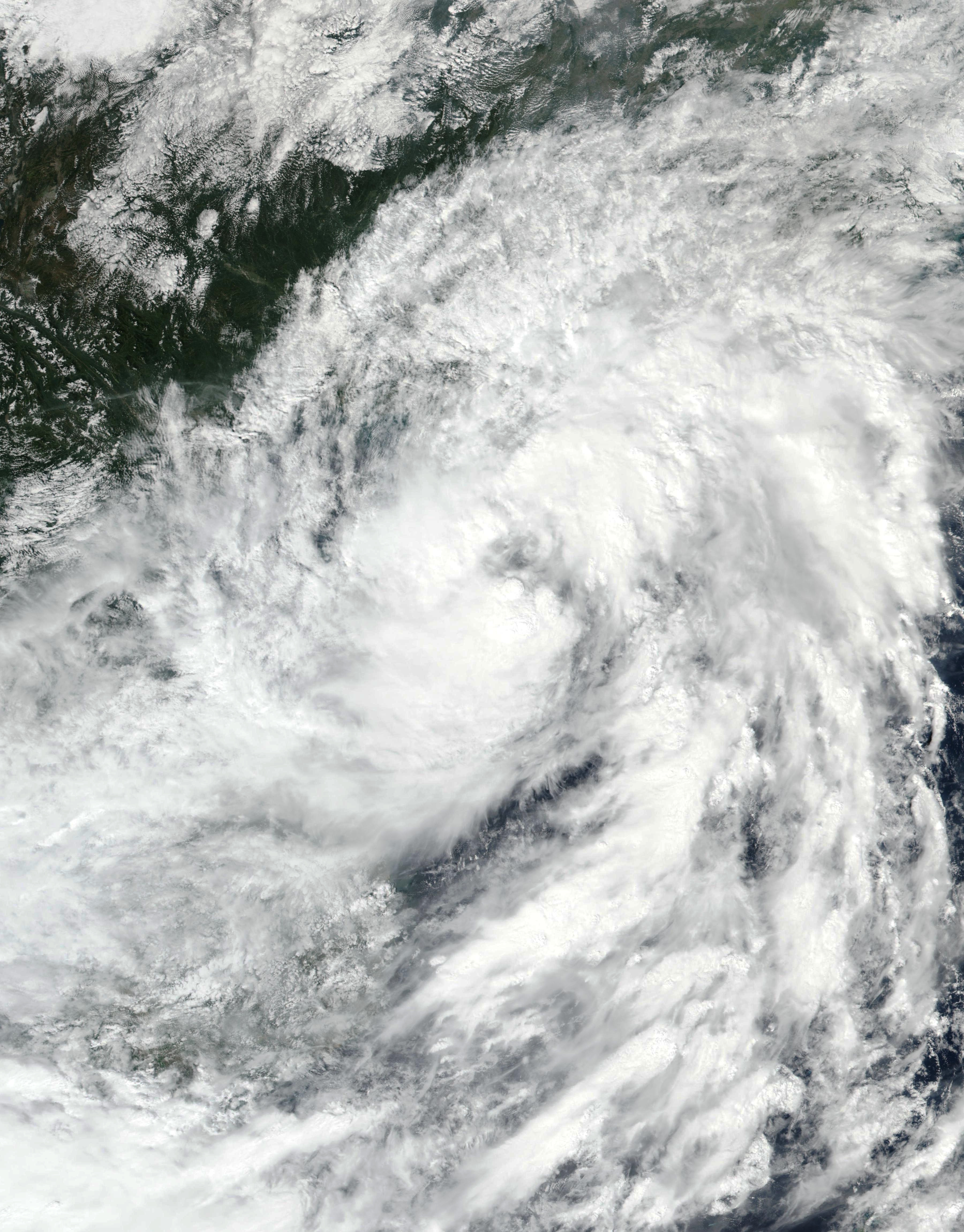
Tropical Storm Nangka approaching Vietnam on 13 October

A tropical depression formed west of Luzon on 11 October, and was upgraded to a tropical storm and named Nangka the following day. On 13 October, Nangka crossed the Gulf of Tonkin, and it made landfall in Ninh Bình on 14 October.

In preparation for Tropical Storm Nangka, more than 150,000 people in Vietnam were evacuated from their homes. Several provinces banned vessels from departing to sea during the storm. On 14 October, Vinh International Airport in Nghệ An and Thọ Xuân Airport in Thanh Hóa were temporarily closed. Vietnam Airlines and Pacific Airlines announced the cancellation of eight flights to the two airports.

Still, wind gusts reached up to 120 km/h (75 mph) in Nam Định. Heavy rainfall was recorded in several northern provinces, including 411 mm (16.18 inches) in Yên Bái and 375 mm (14.76 inches) in Quảng Ninh on 16 October. The storm caused two deaths and left one person missing in Northern Vietnam.

=== Tropical Depression Ofel ===
After entering the South China Sea, Ofel made landfall and subsequently dissipated over Central Vietnam on 16 October. Ten deaths had been reported by 21 October, likely attributed to the remnants of Ofel combined with the effects the northeast monsoon. Rainfall had significantly decreased as of 20 October.

=== Hướng Hóa landslides ===
On 18 October, a sudden landslide buried the barracks of an army economic division in Hướng Phùng Commune, Hướng Hoá District of Quảng Trị Province, resulting in the deaths of 22 soldiers. Another landslide in the district also killed six members of a family and one rescue worker.

=== Tropical Storm Saudel ===
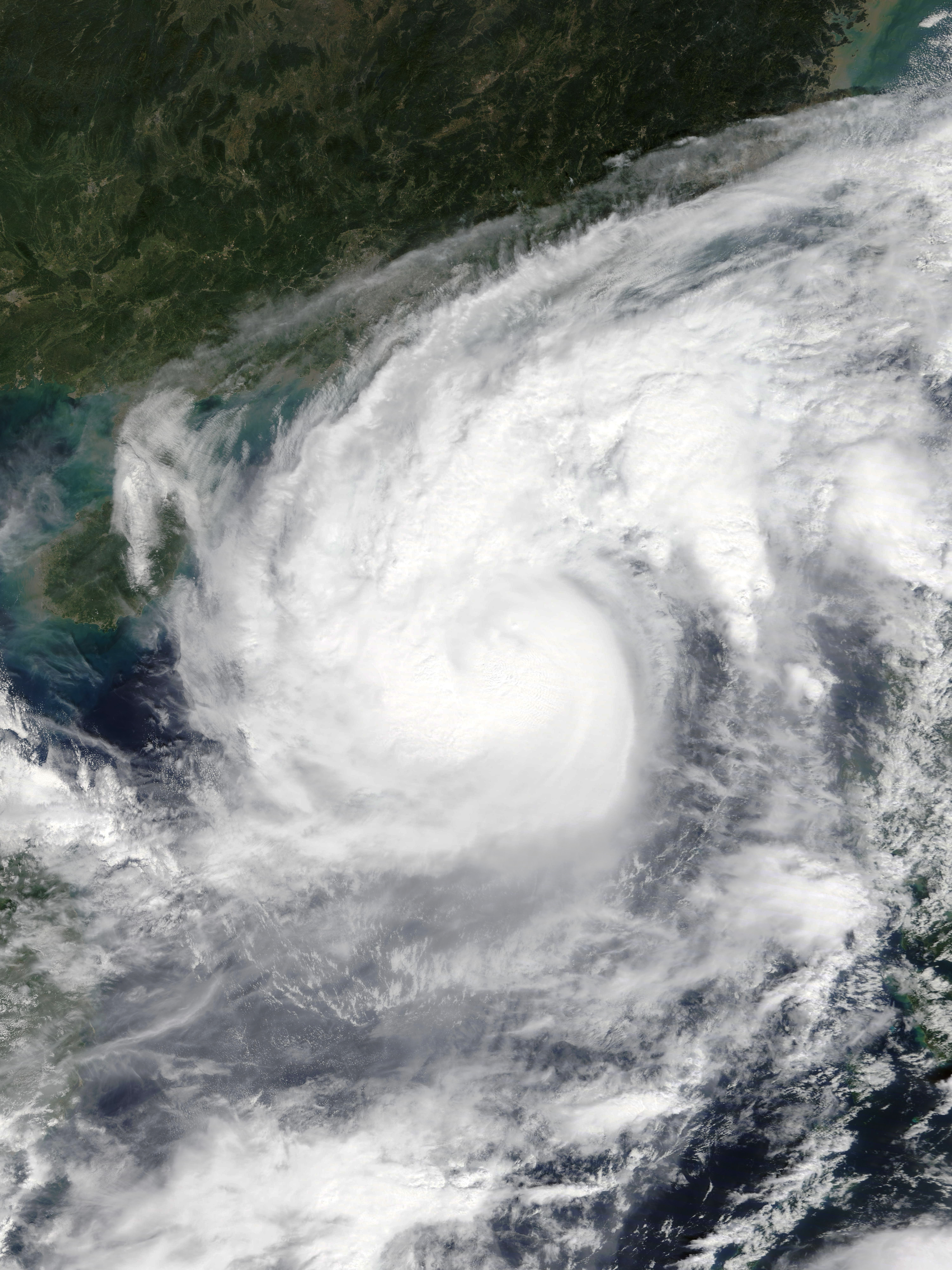
Typhoon Saudel over the South China Sea on 23 October

As Typhoon Saudel approached Vietnam, it began to rapidly weaken due to high vertical wind shear and was downgraded to a tropical storm on 24 October. It was further downgraded to a remnant low on the next day, as its center became largely devoid of deep convection. Despite its weakening, Saudel still brought heavy rainfall to Central Vietnam.

The storm also generated strong winds and rough seas in the waters off the Malaysian state of Sabah, where the Malaysian Meteorological Department (MetMalaysia) issued a tropical storm advisory, noting that the storm was located 1,315 km (817.1 mi) northwest of Kudat, the nearest town.

=== Typhoon Molave ===
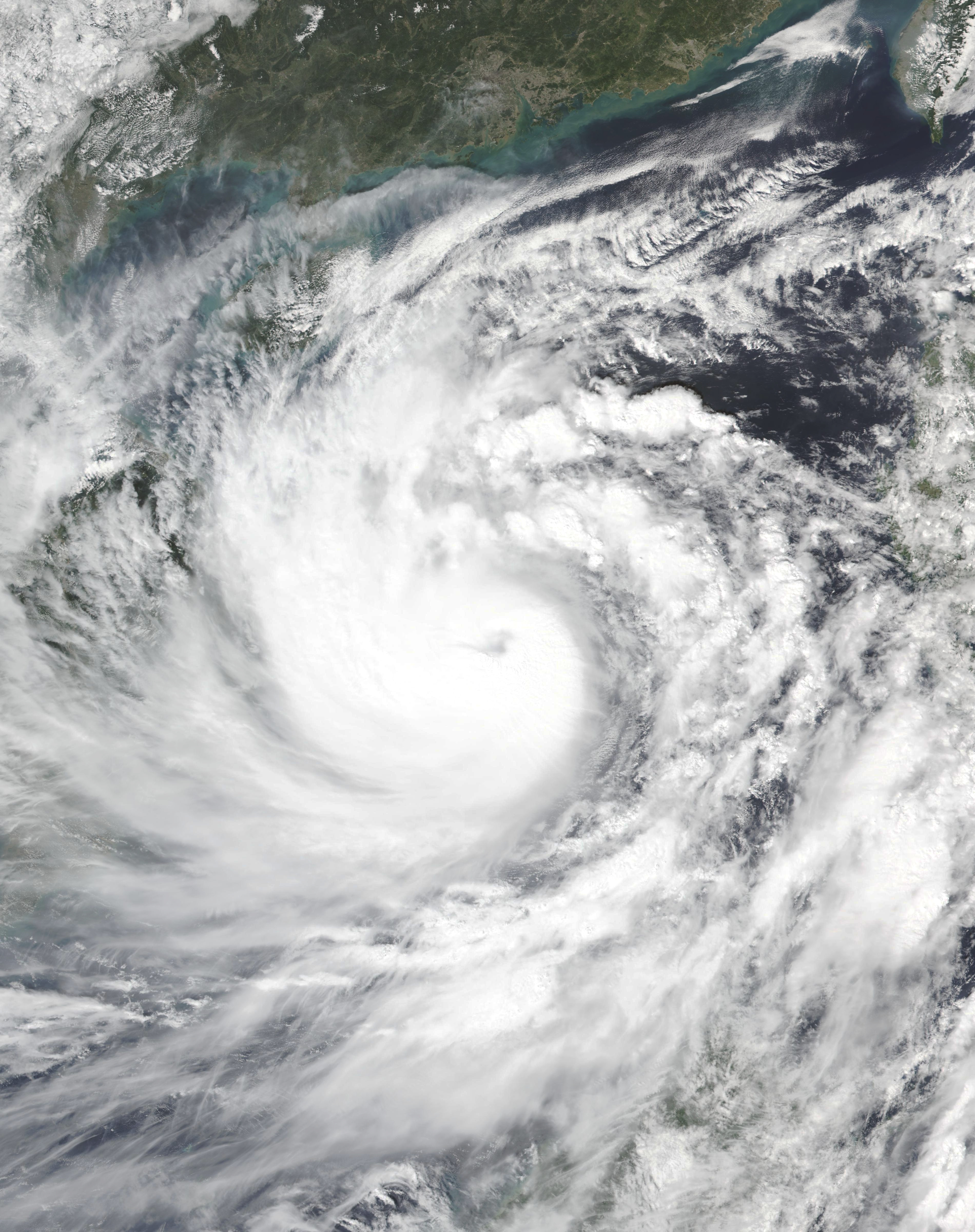
Molave near peak intensity on 27 October near the coast of Vietnam

Typhoon Molave intensifying over the South China Sea on 26 October

Nearly 1.3 million people were evacuated in Vietnam as Prime Minister Nguyễn Xuân Phúc ordered boats onshore and called for preparations by local security forces and residents in the area. The Prime Minister also compared Molave to Typhoon Damrey in 2017. Hundreds of flights were canceled, and schools across affected areas were forced to close. The federal government mobilized approximately 250,000 troops and 2,300 vehicles to support search and rescue missions. Members of the Vietnamese military assisted in evacuating elderly people onto buses, securing vessels, and placing sandbags on rooftops.

On 27 October, the Da Nang People's Committee instructed people to remain indoors starting at 20:00 local time and advised all government officials and workers to stay home the following day as part of emergency preparedness measures. The same day, two Vietnamese fishing vessels sank due to the approaching typhoon. Search efforts were launched to locate the 26 missing fishermen aboard the boats.

Molave began impacting Vietnam late on 27 October. By the morning of 28 October, the entire island of Lý Sơn alongside its 20,000 inhabitants had lost power and was battered by sustained winds of up to 165 km/h (103 mph) for hours. Coastal areas experienced wave heights reaching 6 metres (20 feet).

The typhoon caused widespread destruction across Central Vietnam. Wind gusts peaked at 176 km/h (109 mph) in the city of Quảng Ngãi. Heavy rainfall was also recorded, with Sơn Kỳ (Quảng Ngãi Province) receiving 470 mm (18.50 inches) of precipitation within 24 hours. Molave damaged or destroyed 56,163 houses and left approximately 6.5 million people without electricity. It caused 13 deaths, injured 16 people, and left 48 others missing.

As of 1 November, Vietnam estimated total economic losses from Molave at approximately 10 trillion VND (US$430 million).

==== Quảng Nam landslides ====
Devastating landslides caused by Molave have killed at least 28 people in the communes of Nam Trà My District, Quảng Nam Province. Another landslide in Phước Sơn District buried 11 members of a family.

=== Tropical Storm Goni ===
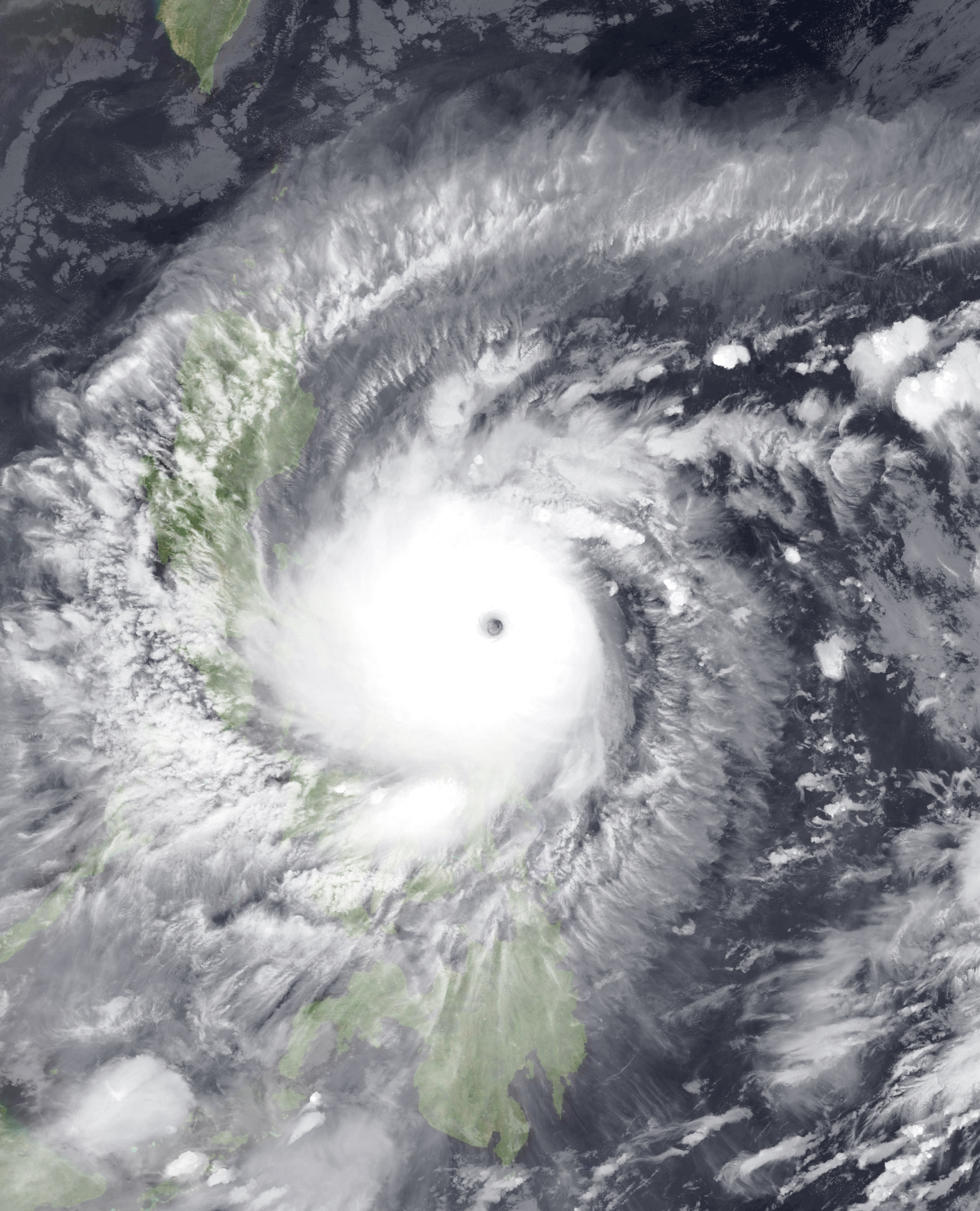
Typhoon Goni at peak intensity shortly before landfall in the Philippines on 31 October

After making a catastrophic landfall in Catanduanes, Typhoon Goni moved into the South China Sea with sustained winds ranging from 65 to 70 km/h (40 to 43 mph) before briefly weakening again into a tropical depression with winds of 50 km/h (31 mph). Its convection became decoupled from its low-level circulation due to anticyclonic wind shear generated by the nearby Tropical Storm Atsani (Siony) over northern Luzon combined with cooler sea surface temperatures. As a result, Goni's associated trough brought further showers, thunderstorms, and flooding to already rain-saturated areas of Vietnam, previously affected by Linfa, Nangka, Ofel, Saudel and Molave. Goni also caused unusual flooding to coastal cities of Nha Trang and Quy Nhơn.

According to the National Centre for Hydro-Meteorological Forecasting, the storm was expected to impact areas between Da Nang and Phú Yên on 5 November. As of 3 November, just two days before the projected landfall, the only preparations that had been made were the issuance of a no-sail order, affecting about 50,000 fishing boats. On 4 November, Quảng Ngãi People's Committee Chairman Đặng Văn Minh ordered evacuations in landslide-prone areas. Meanwhile, the National Committee for Natural Disaster Prevention and Control and Search and Rescue mobilized more than 64,500 personnel and 1,718 vehicles to support emergency response efforts.

On 5 November, Tropical Depression Goni made landfall in southern Bình Định Province, marking the fifth tropical cyclone to strike the country within 30 days. On 6 November, a man in Quảng Ngãi Province was swept away by floodwaters, while another went missing after his ship sank. Twenty houses in Quảng Nam Province collapsed into a river and a school was damaged. In Bình Định Province, two houses were destroyed by landslides and 228 hectares (560 acres) of croplands were damaged. Roads in several provinces were damaged by erosion and landslides, including parts of the Ho Chi Minh Highway.

Damages in Bình Định from both Goni and the later Tropical Storm Etau were calculated to be ₫543 billion (US$23.5 million).

=== Tropical Storm Etau ===
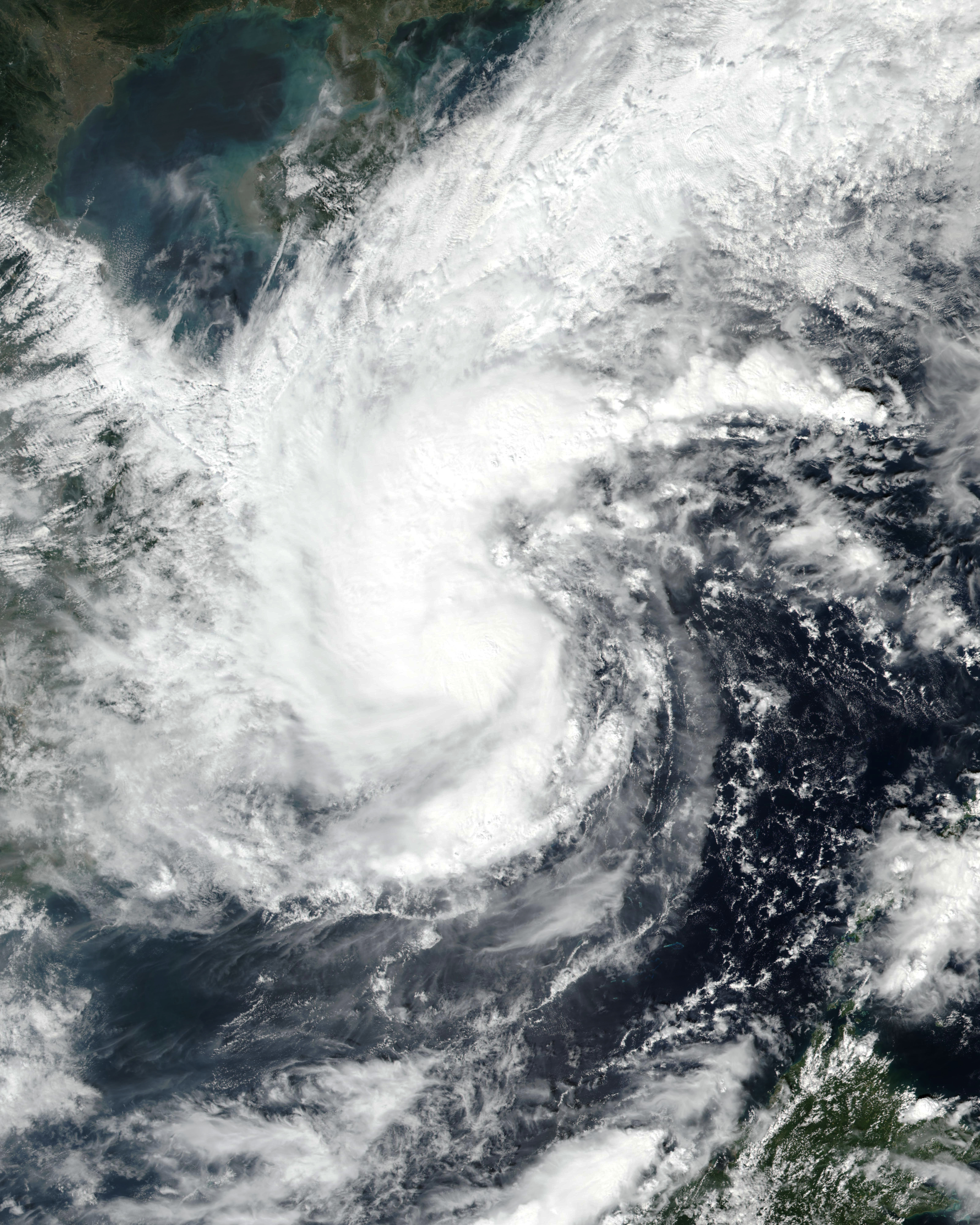
Tropical Storm Etau at peak intensity.

On 7 November, the JMA began tracking a tropical depression 850 km (530 mi) east-southeast of Manila. At 12:00 UTC on the same day, the PAGASA declared the system as a tropical depression and named it Tonyo as it formed over Burias Island. It further strengthened into a tropical storm on 9 November and received the international name Etau. Etau then continued its path toward Central Vietnam after crossing the Philippines.

The storm made landfall on 10 November, resulting in two deaths: one in Quảng Nam and one in Bình Định, and damaging 31 houses. It brought over 250 mm (9.84 inches) of rainfall to the provinces of Bình Định, Khánh Hòa, and Phú Yên. Strong winds associated with Etau uprooted trees and tore the roofs off buildings, many of which were still recovering from the prior impacts of Typhoon Molave and the weakened Tropical Storm Goni. Localized power outages were also reported in the city of Tuy Hòa.

Economic losses in Tuy An District, Phú Yên were estimated at 122 billion VND (US$5.26 million).

=== Typhoon Vamco ===
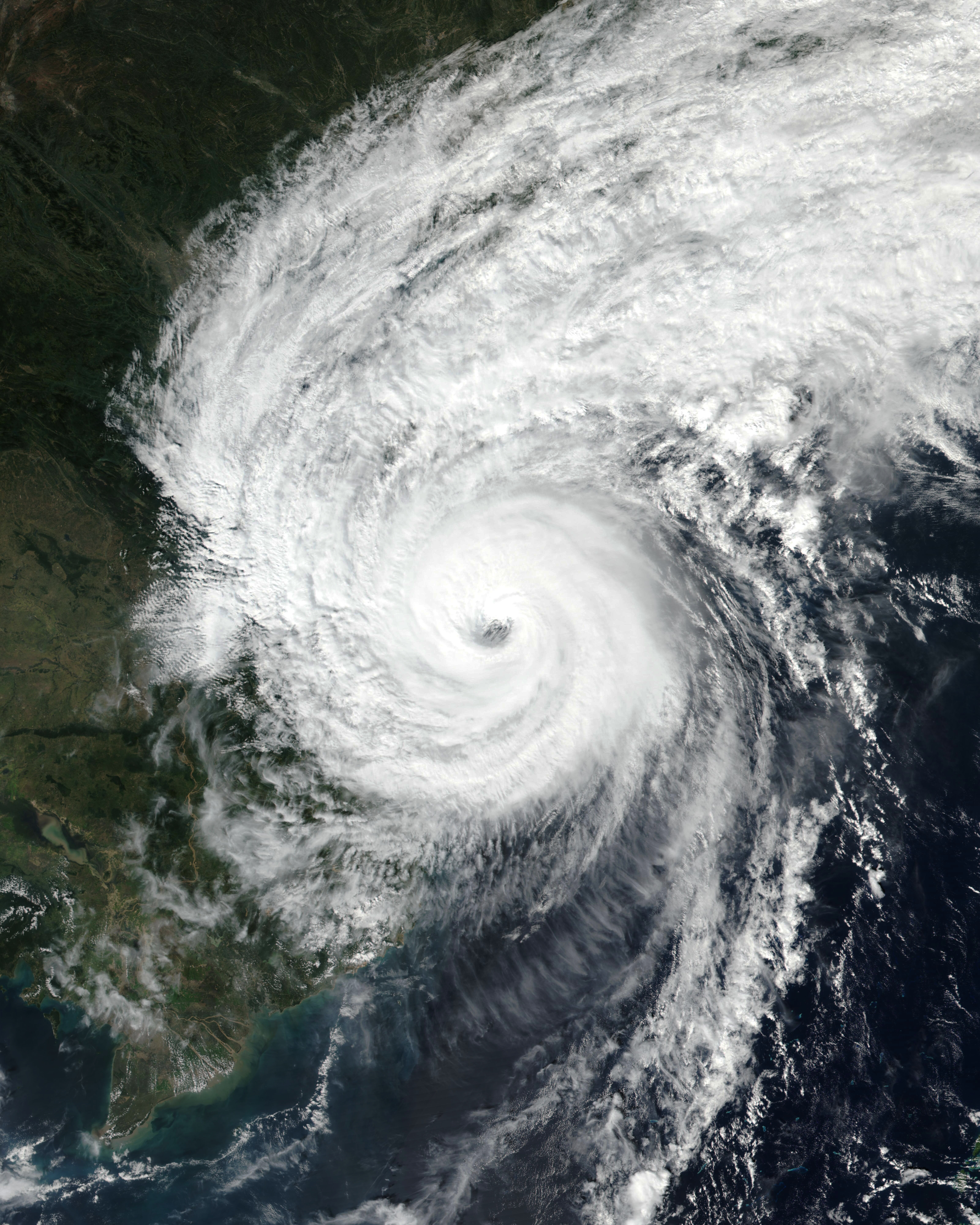
Vamco approaching Vietnam at peak intensity over the South China Sea on 13 November

After crossing and wreaking havoc in the Philippines as Typhoon Ulysses with an initial peak of a Category 3-equivalent typhoon, the storm gradually weakened below typhoon status before it exited the Philippine Area of Responsibility (PAR) at 01:30 UTC on 12 November.

After exiting the PAR, Vamco continued its path towards Vietnam. On 14 November, the Vietnamese Government ordered the evacuation of at least 460,000 people in anticipation of the typhoon's landfall. That morning, all flights at five airports: Da Nang, Chu Lai, Phú Bài, Đồng Hới and Vinh were either suspended or delayed due to the approaching storm.

Vamco began affecting Central Vietnam around midnight ICT on 15 November. Despite having weakened, a weather station on Lý Sơn island reported sustained winds of 100 km/h (62 mph) and gusts reaching 115 km/h (71 mph). Strong winds uprooted trees and damaged numerous homes across four provinces from Hà Tĩnh to Thừa Thiên Huế. In Thuận An (Thừa Thiên Huế), large waves battered docking fishing vessels and homes. In Da Nang, storm surge destroyed sections of sea embankments and scattered rocks and debris across roads and residential areas.

Power outages affected 411,252 households in six central provinces. One person was killed in Thừa Thiên Huế, with over 1,500 houses collapsed and economic losses in Quảng Bình reached 450 billion VND (US$19.4 million). As of 16 November, Vietnamese authorities reported the evacuation 325,000 individuals and five injuries due to Vamco.

== Floodings by province ==
=== Nghệ An ===
Flooding in Nghệ An killed two people. Estimated damages reached approximately 3 trillion VND (US$129.44 million).

=== Hà Tĩnh ===
From 16 to 19 October, heavy rainfall associated with Tropical Depression Ofel affected several areas in Hà Tĩnh, including Kỳ Thượng, which recorded 1,691 mm (66.57 inches) of rain, and Lake Kim Sơn, which received 1,334 mm (52.52 inches). Flooding in the province killed six people. Damages were estimated at about 5.5 trillion VND (US$237.47 million).

=== Quảng Bình ===
From 6 to 13 October, tropical cyclones delivered approximately 550 to 1,200 mm of rain in Quảng Bình. From 16 to 19 October, remnants of Ofel brought 1,063 mm (41.85 inches) of rain in Vạn Trạch. Flooding in Quảng Bình killed 19 people, flooded 95,000 houses and caused power outages in 190,000 households. The estimated economic losses from by floods and landslides in the province totaled about 3,511 billion VND (US$151.49 million).

=== Quảng Trị ===
From 10 to 19 October, the remnants of Linfa and Ofel brought heavy rainfall to Quảng Trị. Hướng Linh District recorded 3,245 mm (127.76 inches) of precipitation in a period of 13 days. Landslides hit a military barracks on 17 October, killing 22 soldiers. In total, floods and landslides caused 52 deaths, left two people missing, and resulting in estimated damages of about 3 trillion VND (US$129.4 million). Quảng Trị authorities have requested assistance from the government, including materials and rescue equipment such as two amphibious vehicles, 27 boats, various rescue tools, and disinfectant chemicals.

=== Thừa Thiên Huế ===
In Thừa Thiên Huế, its mountainous districts recorded the highest rainfall levels in the region, mostly due to Linfa. In three days, from 10 to 13 October, Linfa brought 2,290 mm (90.16 inches) of rain in A Lưới. During the same period, Lake Khe Ngang experienced 2,276 mm (89.61 inches) of rainfall, breaking the historical record of 2,244 mm set in October 1999, while Thượng Nhật received a daily rainfall total of 719 mm (28.31 inches) on 13 October. Overall, three tropical cyclones from 5 to 19 October brought average precipitation amounts of approximately 1,900 to 2,300 mm (74.8 to 90.55 inches) across the province, which peak values recorded in A Lưới with 2,941 mm (115.79 inches) and Bạch Mã with 2,869 mm (112.95 inches).

In total, the floods resulted in 31 deaths and caused an approximately 2 trillion VND (US$86.29 million) in damages in the province.

=== Da Nang ===
Floods in Da Nang killed three people.

=== Quảng Nam ===
Flooding in Quảng Nam killed 13 people. The city of Hội An was flooded following heavy rainfall from 7 to 8 October due to Invest (Tropical Low) 91W. Total economic losses in the province were estimated at about 11 trillion VND (US$478 million).

=== Other regions ===
Floods and landslides due to 91W, Linfa and Ofel caused six deaths in the provinces of Quảng Ngãi, Gia Lai, Đắk Lắk, Lâm Đồng and Kon Tum.

== International aid ==
The Vietnamese Government has allocated 500 billion VND (US$21.52 million) to the five provinces most severely affected by the floods to support rescue efforts and social welfare programs.

- United States: On 17 October, the United States Agency for International Development (USAID) affirmed immediate assistance worth US$200,000 to support efforts in response to severe flooding in Vietnam and Cambodia.
  - On 30 October, the United States secretary of state Mike Pompeo announced that the United States Government had provided Vietnam with US$2 million in flood relief assistance.
- United Nations: On 18 October, the United Nations, in collaboration with Save the Children Vietnam, pledged US$100,000 in assistance to Vietnam.
  - On 6 November, the UN's Central Emergency Response Fund (CERF) committed an additional US$3 million to support communities affected by storms and flooding in the country.
  - From 17 to 27 November, the United Nations Children's Fund (UNICEF) delivered ready-to-use therapeutic foods (RUTFs) along with water, sanitation, and hygiene (WASH) supplies to support Vietnamese children impacted by the disasters. As of 27 November, UNICEF had secured US$2.56 million in funding to implement its flood response plan in Vietnam.
- ASEAN: On 18 October, the ASEAN Coordinating Centre for Humanitarian Assistance (AHA Centre) donated 1,000 shelter repair kits and 1,300 kitchen sets to Vietnam.
- South Korea: On 23 October, the Government of South Korea announced a humanitarian aid package worth US$300,000 to support Vietnam's flood recovery efforts.
- China: On 23 October, the Red Cross Society of China provided US$100,000 in assistance to help Vietnam respond to the impacts of severe flooding.
- Taiwan: Taiwan donated US$400,000 in humanitarian aid to support Vietnam's flood response efforts.
- Australia: The Australian Government contributed AU$100,000 (US$71,300) in flood relief assistance for Vietnam.
- Malaysia: Despite challenges caused by the worsening COVID-19 pandemic, the Vietnamese community and associations in Malaysia had raised a total of 600 million VND in donations to support flood-affected populations in Vietnamese, particularly low-income households.
- Asian Development Bank: The ADB initially provided US$3 million in flood recovery aid. Additionally, on 24 November, Vietnam's Ministry of Agriculture and Rural Development (MARD) and the ADB signed an agreement for a US$2.5 million emergency grant for natural disaster relief.
- European Union: The EU provided €1.3 million (US$1.52 million) for critical humanitarian assistance to support families affected by severe flooding across Central Vietnam.
- Ireland: The Irish Government provided an initial grant of €260,000 (approximately US$300,000) to address urgent humanitarian needs of vulnerable communities in Quảng Bình and Quảng Trị. The funding was channeled through Plan International Vietnam and Project RENEW.
- United Kingdom: On 3 November, the UK announced a contribution of £500,000 (US$649,100) in aid for Central Vietnam, which had been severely impacted by the worst flooding in the last two decades.
- Switzerland: On 10 November, the Swiss Government sent CHF 300,000 ($328,803) in immediate relief aid to support flood-affected communities in Central Vietnam.
- Netherlands: The Netherlands has pledged €2 million (US$2.35 million) in emergency assistance to people impacted by successive storms during October and floods in Central Vietnam. When and how this would be paid is unknown.
- Argentina: On 7 November, the Embassy of Vietnam in Buenos Aires organized a fundraising event, encouraging contributions from the staff, personnel of Vietnamese representative offices, and their families to support flood victims in Vietnam.
- India: On 24 December 2020, the Indian Navy corvette INS Kiltan (P30) arrived in Ho Chi Minh City, delivering 15 tonnes of humanitarian relief supplies to support communities affected by flooding.

== See also ==
- 2019 Vietnam floods
- 2013 Southeast Asian floods
- 2020 Pacific typhoon season
