= Typhoon Goni =

Pacific typhoon in 2020

Typhoon Goni (Rolly)
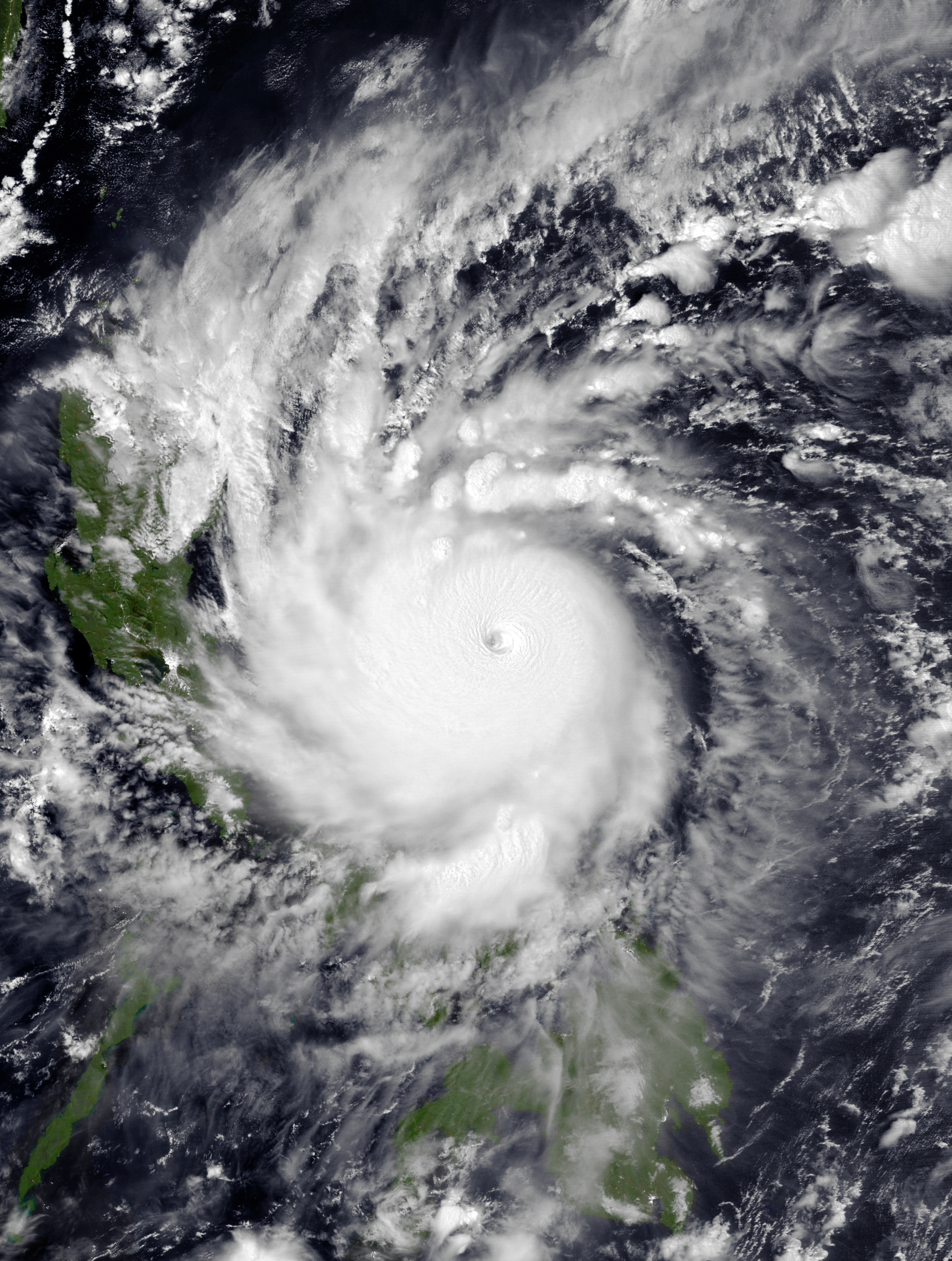
- Goni approaching the Philippines at peak intensity on October 31

Meteorological history
- Formed: October 26, 2020
- Dissipated: November 6, 2020

Violent typhoon
- 10-minute sustained (JMA)
- Highest winds: 220 km/h (140 mph)
- Lowest pressure: 905 hPa (mbar); 26.72 inHg

Category 5-equivalent super typhoon
- 1-minute sustained (SSHWS/JTWC)
- Highest winds: 315 km/h (195 mph) (Record highest at landfall)
- Lowest pressure: 884 hPa (mbar); 26.10 inHg

Overall effects
- Fatalities: 32
- Injuries: 399
- Missing: 6
- Damage: $1.02 billion (2020 USD)
- Areas affected: Philippines; Vietnam
- IBTrACS
- Part of the 2020 Pacific typhoon season

Typhoon Goni, (Note: The name Goni (Korean: 고니, [ko̞ni]) was contributed by South Korea and means swan in Korean.) known in the Philippines as Super Typhoon Rolly, was an extremely powerful and destructive tropical cyclone that made landfall in the Philippines as a Category 5-equivalent super typhoon in late October 2020. It is the strongest tropical cyclone on record by one-minute maximum sustained winds at landfall. The nineteenth named storm, ninth typhoon, and second super typhoon of the 2020 Pacific typhoon season, Goni originated as a tropical depression south portion of Guam on October 26. It was then named as Tropical Storm Goni on October 27. On the next day, Goni explosively intensified over the Philippine Sea, becoming a Category 5–equivalent super typhoon on October 30. Goni maintained Category 5 strength for over a day, before making landfall in Catanduanes at peak intensity, with 10-minute sustained winds of 220 km/h (140 mph), and one-minute sustained winds of 315 km/h (195 mph), with a minimum central pressure of 905 hPa (mbar; 26.72 inHg). It was the most intense tropical cyclone worldwide in 2020.

Following its first landfall, Goni rapidly weakened while it moved over the Sierra Madre mountain range of the Philippines. The storm brought severe flash flooding to Legazpi, as well as lahar flow from the nearby Mayon Volcano. There were widespread power outages as well as damaged power and transmission lines in Bicol. Crops were also heavily damaged. Over 390,000 out of 1 million evacuated individuals have been displaced in the region. Due to the extreme wind speed of the typhoon, two evacuation shelters had their roofing lost. Debris and lahars had also blocked various roads, as well as rendering the Basud Bridge impassible. In Vietnam, where Goni made landfall as a tropical depression, there was flooding in numerous areas, as well as eroded and damaged roads. This exacerbated the 2020 Central Vietnam floods, leaving additional estimated damages of ₫543 billion (US$23.5 million). Overall, the typhoon killed at least 32 people and caused at least ₱20 billion (US$359 million) worth of damage. The COVID-19 pandemic was also a concern for people in evacuation centers.

After Goni moved into the South China Sea, it weakened to a tropical storm. It started to move generally westward towards Vietnam. It eventually reached the country late on November 5 as a tropical depression, bringing heavy rain and gusty winds. International relief from several countries as well as the United Nations followed soon after the typhoon moved away from the Philippines. The relief included donations totaling up to $11.48 million and protection from the pandemic, among other items.

== Meteorological history ==
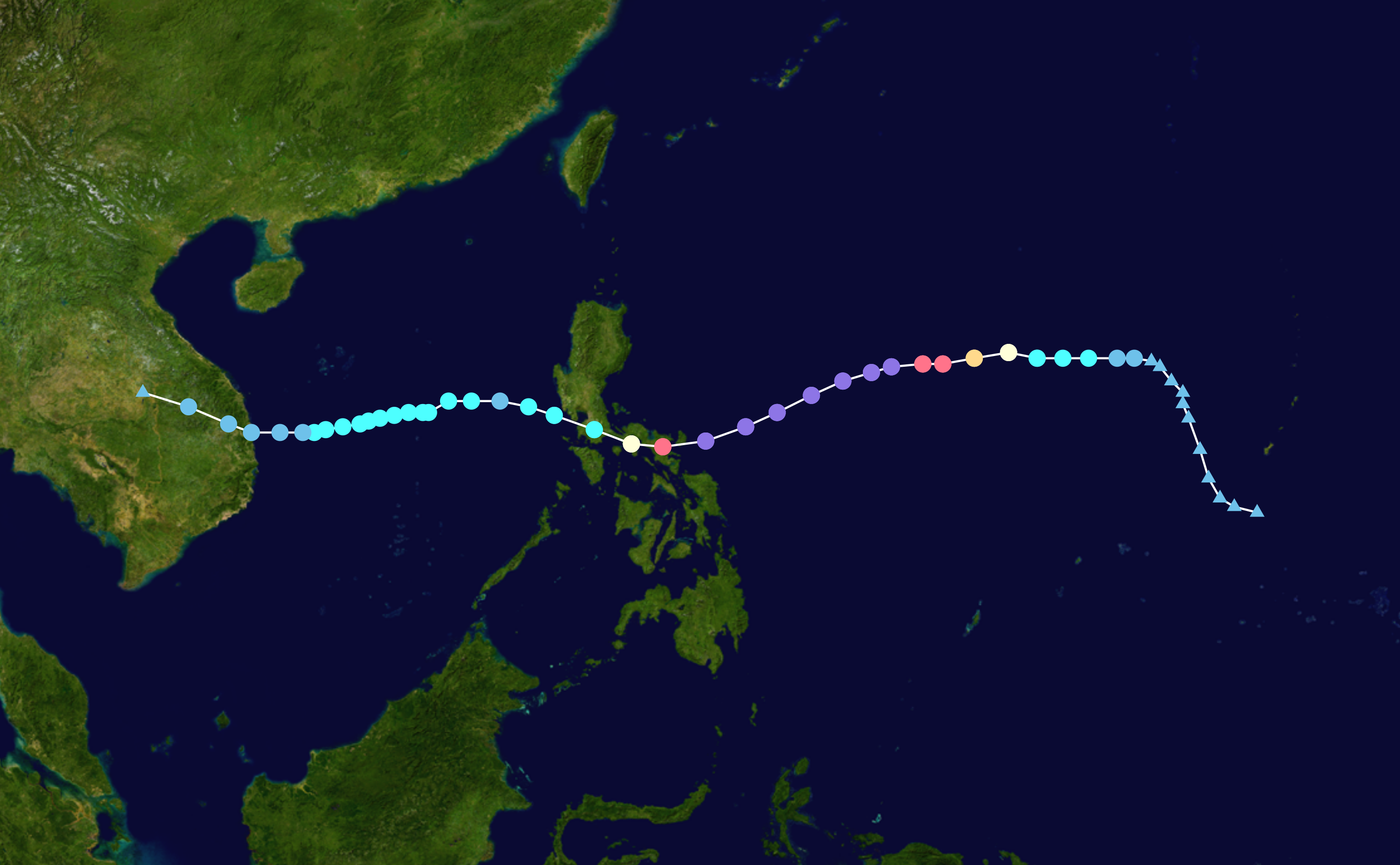
Map plotting the storm's track and intensity, according to the Saffir–Simpson scale Map key Saffir–Simpson scale Tropical depression (≤38 mph, ≤62 km/h) Tropical storm (39–73 mph, 63–118 km/h) Category 1 (74–95 mph, 119–153 km/h) Category 2 (96–110 mph, 154–177 km/h) Category 3 (111–129 mph, 178–208 km/h) Category 4 (130–156 mph, 209–251 km/h) Category 5 (≥157 mph, ≥252 km/h) Unknown Storm type Tropical cyclone Subtropical cyclone Extratropical cyclone, remnant low, tropical disturbance, or monsoon depression

After Typhoon Molave devastated the Philippines, the Japan Meteorological Agency (JMA) announced the formation of a new tropical depression in the Pacific Ocean, west of the Mariana Islands, on October 27. Given its proximity to the Philippine Area of Responsibility (PAR), along with its westward forecasted track, the Philippine Atmospheric, Geophysical, and Astronomical Services Administration (PAGASA) also began issuing advisories on the newly formed system. By the next day, the Joint Typhoon Warning Center (JTWC) had also followed and upgraded the system into a tropical depression. The storm had good outflow and structure as it approached the PAR.

As the system continued tracking westward under favorable conditions in the Pacific Ocean, the JMA and JTWC upgraded the system into a tropical storm, with the JMA assigning the name Goni to the intensifying system. The PAGASA followed with an upgrade to a severe tropical storm a few hours later. Due to the warm waters surrounding the storm, the system underwent rapid intensification and became a typhoon on October 29. On October 29, at 09:30 UTC, Goni entered the PAR and was named Rolly by the PAGASA. Early on the following day, the system was declared a super typhoon by the JTWC a few hours later, the second super typhoon of the season, before further intensifying into the only Category 5-equivalent super typhoon of the season by 06:00 UTC on October 30. After undergoing a brief eyewall replacement cycle on October 31, which is a typical process for a storm of such high intensity, it resumed intensifying, with the JTWC, JMA, and Satellite Analysis Branch all assessing Dvorak technique T-numbers of 8.0, the highest on the scale. On this basis, the JTWC estimated 1-minute sustained winds of 315 km/h (195 mph), tying with Haiyan in 2013, Meranti in 2016 and Surigae in 2021 as the highest reliably estimated in the Eastern Hemisphere. Meanwhile, the JMA estimated a central barometric pressure of 905 hPa (mbar; 26.72 inHg) for the storm, while the JTWC estimated a minimum central pressure of 884 hPa (mbar; 26.1 inHg).

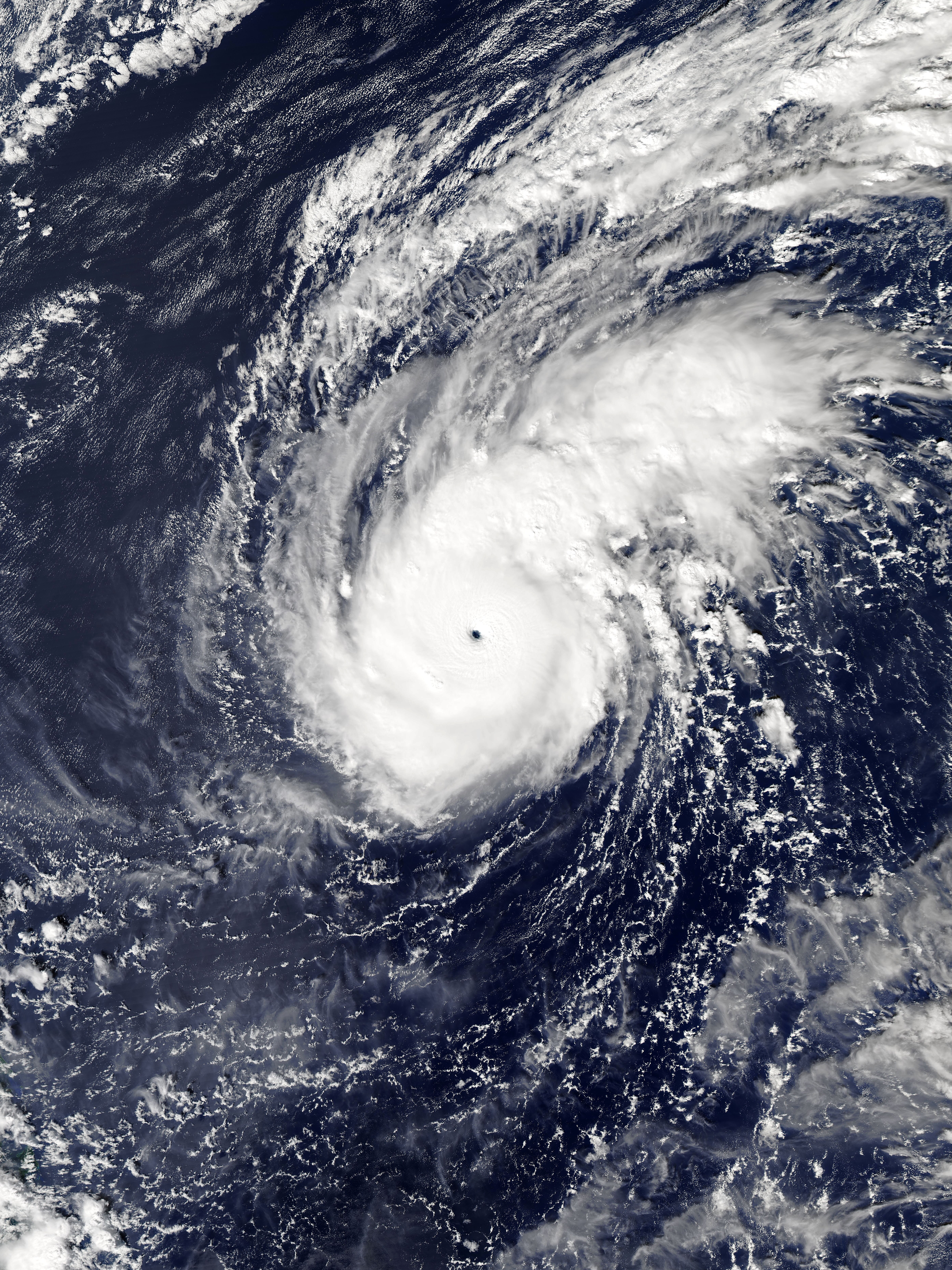
Typhoon Goni near its initial peak intensity over the Philippine Sea on October 30, showing a very clear pinhole eye.

At 18:00 UTC on October 31 (2:00 PHT November 1), hours before Goni's first landfall, PAGASA upgraded Goni into a super typhoon. This was the second time that the PAGASA declared a system as a super typhoon since its introduction of the revised tropical cyclone intensity scale, the first being Haima in 2016. This is also the second time that the highest wind warning level, Signal #5, was raised in the Philippines as per the revised tropical cyclone wind signals. At 20:50 UTC on October 31 (4:50 PHT November 1), Goni made landfall in Bato, Catanduanes, Philippines, at peak intensity, as a Category 5-equivalent super typhoon. The JMA and PAGASA both reported 10-minute sustained winds of 220 km/h (140 mph) and 225 km/h (140 mph), respectively, while the JTWC estimated 1-minute sustained winds of 315 km/h (195 mph) at the time of landfall. By 1-minute sustained winds, this made Goni the strongest recorded tropical cyclone to ever make landfall anywhere in the world. Around 24 minutes after landfall, a minimum pressure of 912.1 mbar (26.93 inHg) was recorded by a weather station in Virac as Goni passed directly over it. Goni made additional landfalls in Tiwi, Albay at 23:20 UTC and San Narciso, Quezon at 04:00 UTC, on November 1. Goni then made its fourth and final landfall in the Philippines in Lobo, Batangas at 09:30 UTC. Interaction with land, plus an increase in wind shear caused Goni to rapidly weaken and it emerged over the South China Sea as a minimal tropical storm.

Before exiting the PAR, Goni slightly reintensified, but further development was hampered by unfavorable conditions. The system exited the PAR at 12:00 UTC (20:00 PHT) on November 3. Goni's convection decoupled from its low-level circulation as a result of anticyclonic shear generated by the nearby Tropical Storm Atsani (Siony) from Northern Luzon, before making landfall in Vietnam on November 6. Goni rapidly weakened after landfall, degenerating into a trough by 00:00 UTC on the next day. Goni's remnant trough then brought rain and more flooding to an already rain-stricken Vietnam from previous Linfa, Nangka, Ofel, and Molave, which had all struck the same region a few weeks earlier.

== Preparations ==
=== Philippines ===
==== Highest Tropical Cyclone Wind Signal ====
Highest Tropical Cyclone Wind Signal issued by PAGASA for Goni (Rolly) in each province. The white line represents the best track.

The Bicol Regional Disaster Risk Reduction and Management Council (RDRRMC) issued a no-sail policy that was put in place on October 29. The Philippine Coast Guard stopped giving travel permits to sea vessels bound for the Polillo Island. On October 30 at 8:00 PHT (0:00 UTC), authorities of Quezon placed the province in red alert in preparation for the storm, which requires operation and monitoring teams to be available at all times as the typhoon worsens. At the same time, the Camarines Norte Incident Management Team began evacuating 35,000 families, around 159,000 people, from high-risk areas, including coastal villages inside the province's bayside capital, Daet. On the same day, the NDRRMC raised a nationwide red alert in preparation for the storm's impact.

The Research Institute for Tropical Medicine, one of the largest COVID-19 sample testing laboratories in the country, announced a temporary suspension of operations on November 1 and 2 in order to mitigate damage to their building and equipment. As the typhoon neared the country, the Philippine Institute of Volcanology and Seismology had issued advisories warning of possible lahar contamination of nearby rivers and drainage areas near Mount Pinatubo, the Mayon Volcano, and the Taal Volcano.

Satellite animation of Typhoon Goni making landfall on Catanduanes on October 31

On the morning of the October 31, less than 24 hours before the typhoon made landfall, PAGASA raised a Signal #3 tropical cyclone warning signal for Catanduanes, with the same signal being raised for the northeastern portions of both Albay and Camarines Sur a few hours later. Local governments across Camarines Sur began forced evacuations, with the province's Provincial Disaster Risk Reduction and Management Council expecting the evacuation of 20,000 families before noon. By noon, the Camarines Norte government had evacuated 6,645 individuals from 75 villages out of a planned 159,000. Food packs worth 8.3 million, non-food items worth 26.42 million, and 3 million in stand-by funds were prepared in the Bicol Region by the Department of Social Welfare and Development, together with local disaster response agencies. Evacuation centers in Aurora were also prepared, with some school buildings designated for use as shelters. In Metro Manila, mayors of the constituent cities have begun their own preparations for the upcoming typhoon, such as halting construction and ordering the dismantling of tents and other outdoor structures. The Disaster Risk Reduction and Management Office of Manila has prepared rescue boats for potential rescue operations.

By evening, PAGASA raised the first Signal #4 tropical cyclone warning of the year in Catanduanes and the eastern portion of Camarines Sur, and in the northern portion of Albay a few hours later. By the end of the day, almost a million individuals were evacuated: 749,000 from Albay and 200,000 from Camarines Sur; this exceeded the number of people evacuated ahead of Typhoon Haiyan in 2013. The Manila International Airport Authority announced that Ninoy Aquino International Airport would be temporarily closed for 24 hours, beginning 10:00 am the following day. Closures in ports left 1,300 passengers stranded in Bicol and Eastern Visayas. Many existing evacuation centers, usually basketball courts and multi-purpose halls, were already being used by victims of the COVID-19 pandemic, which complicated evacuation for those affected by the typhoon.

Avatar of PAGASA-DOST

PAGASA-DOST
(@dost_pagasa)
tweeted:

At 2:00 AM today, Typhoon #RollyPH intensified into a Super Typhoon. TCWS #5 will be raised over Catanduanes, Eastern Camarines Sur, and Albay. Catastrophic wind damage is expected.

October 31, 2020

By the early morning of November 1, hours prior to Goni's landfall, the PAGASA raised Signal #5, the highest tropical cyclone warning signal, in Catanduanes, Albay, and the eastern portion, and eventually the whole, of Camarines Sur. On the morning of Goni's first landfall, the PAGASA raised Signal #4 for the country's capital, Metro Manila. All rail lines, including the Manila Light Rail Transit System and the Manila Metro Rail Transit System suspended operations, along with the EDSA Busway and the PNR Metro Commuter Line.

A total of 480,174 individuals were preemptively evacuated in 8 regions.

=== Vietnam ===
According to the National Center for Hydro-Meteorological Forecasting, the storm would hit Da Nang and Phu Yen provinces on November 5. On November 3, just two days before the expected landfall, the only preparations done were to institute a no-sail policy within the storm's path which affected about 50,000 fishing boats. The following day, Quang Ngai People's Committee Chairman Dang Van Minh asked those living in landslide-prone areas to evacuate, while the National Committee for Disaster Prevention and Search and Rescue mobilized more than 64,500 people and 1,718 vehicles for rescue operations.

== Impact ==
=== Philippines ===
At 20:50 UTC on October 31 (4:50 PHT November 1), Goni made its first landfall in Catanduanes Island at peak intensity, bringing violent, catastrophic winds to areas near the eye of the storm. At least 25 people had died, 399 people were injured and 6 others went missing from the typhoon. Around 125 cities and towns were left without electricity after the storms passing. 1,612,893 individuals over 6 regions were affected by the typhoon. Around 16,900 hectares of cropland were damaged, affecting some 18,000 farmers. It is estimated that 66,000 metric tons of rice, corn, and other high value crops were damaged. In its update, the NDRRMC said a total of P8.47 billion (US$175.44 million) worth of roads, bridges, flood control systems, schools and government buildings were damaged in the Cordillera Administrative Region, National Capital Region, Ilocos, Cagayan Valley, Central Luzon, Calabarzon (Cavite, Laguna, Batangas, Rizal and Quezon), Mimaropa (Mindoro, Marinduque, Romblon and Palawan), Bicol and Eastern Visayas.

Flights and train operations resumed a day after the typhoon's landfall. As of November 11, the NDRRMC has reported ₱12.9 billion (US$266 million) of infrastructure damages, along with ₱5 billion (US$103 million) of agricultural damage, with a combined total of ₱17.9 billion (US$369 million). 31 people were reported dead.

==== Bicol ====
By 8:00 PHT (0:00 UTC), power outages were widespread in the Bicol Region, as 10 electric cooperatives reported a loss of power caused by toppled electric posts and damaged transmission lines. Two evacuation centers lost their roofs from the force of the wind. In Legazpi, flash floods overwhelmed the local villages, and roads were blocked by debris from the mountains and lahar flow from Mayon Volcano. The lahar submerged at least 180 houses, as well as vehicles and livestock, in the locality of Guinobatan, as well as in Tabaco, Santo Domingo, and Camalig. The nearby Basud Bridge, which connects the first and second districts of the province, was also destroyed and rendered impassable due to the lahar, while the famous Cagsawa Ruins were heavily flooded. The Civil Aviation Authority of the Philippines reported significant damage to Naga Airport and moderate damage to Legazpi Airport, along with the loss of contact with Virac Airport, the only airport serving the island of Catanduanes.

In Albay, at least 14 people were killed by the storm, one of which was a 5-year-old child that was reportedly washed away by the flood. In Catanduanes, at least 6 were killed. Three were reported missing. In Pandan, 222 partially damaged houses had been recorded.

==== Calabarzon ====
Laguna de Bay overflowed by 6 ft (1.8 m) due to the rains brought by the typhoon, and nearly 3,000 families were forced to evacuate. Floods in Batangas City reached the roofs of houses, trapping at least 300 families. The Batangas Disaster Risk Reduction and Management Council chief requested for more volunteers from regional government agencies to assist with emergency response. The floods subsided by 21:00 PHT on November 2, with 110 individuals having been rescued by the local disaster management team.

==== Mimaropa ====
In Marinduque, three municipalities experienced flooding, with Santa Cruz experiencing over 6 feet flood waters. 1 person was reported missing while another was injured after the typhoon triggered flash floods in the province. In Oriental Mindoro, one person died, while another was reported missing.

=== Vietnam ===
On November 5, Tropical Depression Goni made landfall in southern Bình Định, becoming the fifth tropical cyclone to strike the country in the previous 30 days. A person in Quảng Ngãi was swept away by floodwaters on November 6. Another sailor went missing on November 6 after the ship he was captaining sunk. Twenty houses in Quảng Nam Province collapsed into a river and a school was damaged. In Bình Định, 22 houses and infrastructures were destroyed by landslides and 108 hectares (270 acres) of croplands were damaged. Floods inundated a total of 1,074 houses. Roads in several areas were damaged by erosion and landslides, including parts of the Ho Chi Minh Highway.

Damage in Bình Định Province from both Goni and Etau were calculated to be ₫543 billion (US$23.5 million).

== Aftermath ==
=== Philippines ===
Costliest Philippine typhoons
Rank	Storm	Season	Damage		Ref.
Rank	Storm	Season	PHP	USD	Ref.
1	Yolanda (Haiyan)	2013	₱95.5 billion	$2.98 billion	
2	Odette (Rai)	2021	₱51.7 billion	$968 million	
3	Glenda (Rammasun)	2014	₱38.6 billion	$771 million	
4	Pablo (Bopha)	2012	₱36.9 billion	$724 million	
5	Ompong (Mangkhut)	2018	₱33.9 billion	$627 million	
6	Pepeng (Parma)	2009	₱27.3 billion	$591 million	
7	Ulysses (Vamco)	2020	₱20.2 billion	$420 million	
8	Crising (Wipha)	2025	₱18.4 billion	$373 million	
9	Kristine (Trami)	2024	₱18.4 billion	$373 million	
10	Rolly (Goni)	2020	₱17.9 billion	$371 million	

On October 31, Cavite officials declared the province under a state of calamity from the effects of the typhoon. In Catanduanes, 90% of infrastructure was damaged as reported by the Philippine National Police, with 10,000 or about 65% of houses made of light materials destroyed, and 3,000 or 20% of larger houses either destroyed or damaged. Communication to the island was limited as about 80% of power posts and communication towers were severely damaged, but communication with the island was quickly reestablished on November 2. Damage to the abaca crop on the island caused by the typhoon is estimated to cost ₱400 million, with other crops' totaling ₱200 million. The total economic loss from the general damage of the typhoon was estimated to be $1.0 billion.

Broadcast news coverage on Goni was significantly reduced compared to typhoons in previous years because of the shutdown of the ABS-CBN broadcast network, which had local news bureaus and strong signal reach in provinces far from Manila. This caused difficulties in disseminating information about Goni to remote localities where only the said network could reach, resulting in people voicing their frustrations on social media during and after the typhoon.

In the Bicol Region alone, over 96,000 families or about 346,000 individuals were in evacuation centers. 390,028 individuals were displaced from their homes, and 1,103 passengers remain stranded in the ports. In Aurora, 9,747 individuals were displaced from their homes. About 226 schools have been damaged by the typhoon, including 7,169 learning materials and 194 computer sets; the majority of which were within Bicol but some were in Mimaropa and Calabarzon. In total, 68.6 million people have been affected by Typhoon Goni in some way, including 724,000 children in the most affected areas.

The NDDRMC had already recommended to not fill evacuation centers completely to comply with social distancing regulations to prevent the spread of COVID-19 before the typhoon struck the country. The Department of Health recommended the usage of modular tents and immediate symptoms screening in evacuation centers, while Secretary of Health Francisco Duque III asked local government to deploy safety officers to prevent the spread of the disease. Nevertheless, many health facilities were damaged by the typhoon, and health workers struggled to get to evacuation centers due to floods. In Manila, which had been battling numerous COVID-19 outbreaks, Mayor Isko Moreno said that the city struggled to strictly follow health protocols in evacuation centers. Due to the complications encountered when assigning evacuation centers, Congress has since revived talks on the construction of dedicated evacuation centers.

On November 2, Camarines Sur officials placed the province under a state of calamity, with Catanduanes doing the same on November 4.

During the 37th ASEAN Summit on November 12, President Rodrigo Duterte urged the organization members to help in fighting against climate change.

==== International aid ====
- United Nations:
  - Food and Agriculture Organization: Helped assess the damage done to crops in affected areas.
  - United Nations Children's Fund (UNICEF): Pre-positioned WASH items, child-friendly tent spaces, as well as education materials.
  - Office for the Coordination of Humanitarian Affairs (OCHA): Launched a US$45.5 million appeal for six-months of support for 260,000 disaster-affected people.
  - International Organization for Migration (IOM): Deployed teams across the Bicol Region and Region IV to assess the needs of those displaced by the Typhoon. In response to the COVID-19 pandemic, the IOM has also sent personal protective equipment, such as 200,000 face masks, 20,000 bottles of sanitizer, 2,000 face shields, and 500 tents.
- United States: Assisted in delivery of relief goods and emergency shelter supplies in Bicol, and donated US$200,000 in emergency assistance through their Agency for International Development.
- Australia: Provided emergency shelter kits through the Philippine Red Cross.
- United Arab Emirates: Donated Dh35 million (US$9.52 million) as urgent humanitarian aid.
- United Kingdom: Donated £1 million (US$1.30 million) to both the Philippines and Vietnam due to the recent onslaught of multiple typhoons, to be distributed by the International Federation of Red Cross and Red Crescent Societies through local Red Cross partners.
- Singapore: The Singapore Red Cross contributed SG$50,000 (US$36,700) to the Philippine Red Cross.
- South Korea: Donated US$200,000 to the Philippine Red Cross.

== Retirement ==
On January 21, 2021, the PAGASA retired the name Rolly from the rotating naming lists due to the catastrophic damage it brought, particularly in the Bicol Region and it will never be used again as a typhoon name within Philippine Area of Responsibility (PAR). It was replaced by Romina and was used for the first time during 2024 season, and also the ice breaker for PAGASA's usage of the name for a tropical storm that didn't enter PAR since 1963.

After the season, the Typhoon Committee announced that the name Goni, along with four others were retired from the naming lists. In the spring of 2022, the name was replaced with Gaenari.

== See also ==
- Weather of 2020
- Tropical cyclones in 2020
- List of violent typhoons
- List of super typhoons
- List of Philippine typhoons (2000–present)
