= Nguyễn Văn Man =

Vietnamese military officer and politician (1966–2020)

- Born: January 12, 1966; Đồng Hới, Quảng Bình Province, Vietnam
- Died: October 13, 2020 (aged 54)
- Branch: People's Army of Vietnam
- Rank: Major general

Nguyễn Văn Man (12 January 1966 – 13 October 2020) was a major general of the People's Army of Vietnam and a politician. He held the position of Deputy Commander of the 4th Military Region of Vietnam People's Army, National Assembly deputy term 14 2016-2021 term of the National Assembly delegation of Quảng Bình Province, member of the National Defense and Security Committee and security of the 14th National Assembly. He was previously the Chief of the Military Command of Quang Binh Province.

== Career ==
Man was a member of the Standing Committee of Quang Binh. On 21 November 2015, the Standing Committee of the Quang Binh Provincial Party Committee assigned Man to hold the position of Commander of the Military Command of Quang Binh province. Man served in this position for 5 years. On 20 May 2019, the Prime Minister of Vietnam Nguyen Xuan Phuc appointed Colonel Man as Deputy Commander of the Military Region 4, People's Army of Vietnam, and promoted him to Major General. On October 10, 2020, Man attended a ceremony to commemorate the 7th anniversary of the 4th Military Region of the Vietnam People's Army. At the meeting, Man's superiors contacted him and ordered him to Thua Thien-Hue, a place that was flooded by Tropical Storm Linfa. This would be his last mission.

Man was also a politician who participated in National Assemblies. On 7 November 2016, discussing the bill on the use of weapons, explosives and supporting tools, he argued that the federal government should divert more money from the Ministry of Public Security to the Ministry of Defense. On the morning of 24 May 2018, at the Discussion on the Denunciation Law project at the 5th session of the 14th National Assembly, he stated that protection for whistleblowers were necessary, since many face threats in Vietnam.

== Final mission and death ==
On October 10, Man and his troops arrived in Thua Thien Hue Province, a province in central Vietnam affected by flooding and mudslides. Man handed food and supplies to the locals. The next day, the major general received news of a landslide burying 10 workers from the Rao Trang 3 hydropower plant, and he organized a team of 21 soldiers to rescue the trapped workers. On the night of 12 to 13 October 2020, when leading the rescue team to the power plant, Major General Man and 13 members of his rescue team were buried in another landslide. On October 15, 2020, his body was found by rescuers.
