= 2019 Vietnam floods =

Natural disasters in Vietnam

Vietnam was hit by several floods in 2019.

== May ==
Heavy rain hit northern Vietnam from 29-30 May, resulting in serious flooding in Ha Giang, Yen Bai, Cao Bang and Thanh Hoa. In Bac Quang, Ha Giang, five houses were destroyed and one child was killed. In Yen Bai, flash floods killed one man in Văn Chấn Commune. In Cao Bang, flooding swept away more than a dozen houses and killed one man.

== August ==
Due to the effects of Typhoon Wipha, western Thanh Hoa was hit by serious flooding on August 2. In Sa Na village, Quan Sơn district, flash floods swept away several houses and killed 15 people. One person was also killed in Bac Kan and another in Dien Bien province.

On August 8, heavy rains hit the provinces of Lâm Đồng, Đắk Nông and Bình Phước, killing 10 people. The Bảo Lộc pass between Ho Chi Minh city and Dalat was hit by landslide. 200 households near Đăk Kar reservoir were prompted to evacuate, fearing its collapse. Phu Quoc island was also hit by serious floods. Damages due to flooding in South-Central Vietnam was estimated at 43.5 million USD.

== September ==
On September 3 to 5, heavy flooding hit the province of Quang Binh, Quang Tri and Ha Tinh, isolating many communes.
