= Tropical Storm Linfa =

Pacific tropical storm in 2020

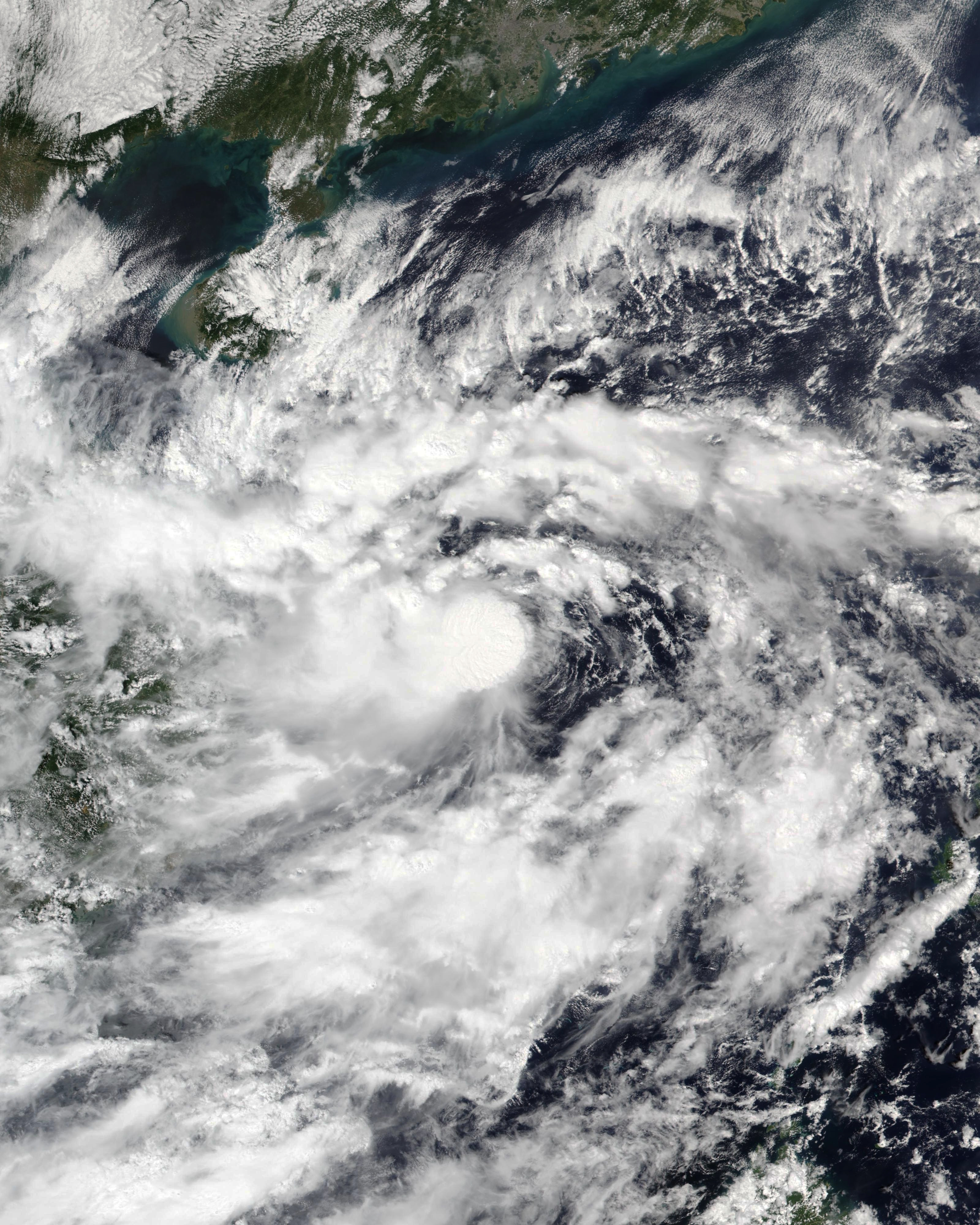
- Tropical Storm Linfa approaching Vietnam on October 11

Meteorological history
- Formed: October 6, 2020
- Dissipated: October 12, 2020

Tropical storm
- 10-minute sustained (JMA)
- Highest winds: 75 km/h (45 mph)
- Lowest pressure: 994 hPa (mbar); 29.35 inHg

Tropical storm
- 1-minute sustained (SSHWS/JTWC)
- Highest winds: 75 km/h (45 mph)
- Lowest pressure: 999 hPa (mbar); 29.50 inHg

Overall effects
- Fatalities: 138
- Missing: 27
- Damage: $217 million (2020 USD)
- Areas affected: Philippines, Vietnam, Cambodia, Laos, Thailand, Myanmar
- IBTrACS /
- Part of the 2020 Pacific typhoon season

Tropical Storm Linfa (Note: The name Linfa (Cantonese: 蓮花, [liːn˨˩ faː˥]) was contributed by Macau and means lotus (Nelumbo nucifera) in Cantonese.) was a weak, short-lived but deadly and destructive tropical cyclone that was the twelfth wettest tropical cyclone on record and the second of nine tropical cyclones in a row to strike Indochina in 2020, a little under a month after the less damaging Tropical Storm Noul. The fifteenth named storm of the 2020 Pacific typhoon season, Linfa originated from a tropical depression which formed just to the west of the Philippines on October 6. After passing through the island nation, the storm emerged into the South China Sea and slowly gained strength, earning the name Linfa on October 10 on approach to Vietnam. On the next day, Linfa had reached peak strength and made landfall in Vietnam, marking the beginning of a devastating series of floods in the country and worsening the already active monsoon season. Linfa quickly dissipated as it moved inland, but associated thunderstorms continued for several days.

Linfa brought record breaking rainfall totals throughout much of the Indochinese Peninsula. 112 people were left dead in Vietnam, with 24 missing. An additional 25 people died in Cambodia and there was 1 killed in Laos with 3 missing. Damage totals throughout Vietnam reached up to US$217 million, or 4.9 trillion đồng. Linfa was also the second-deadliest storm of 2020, closely behind Hurricane Eta and the deadliest of the annual typhoon season.

== Meteorological history ==
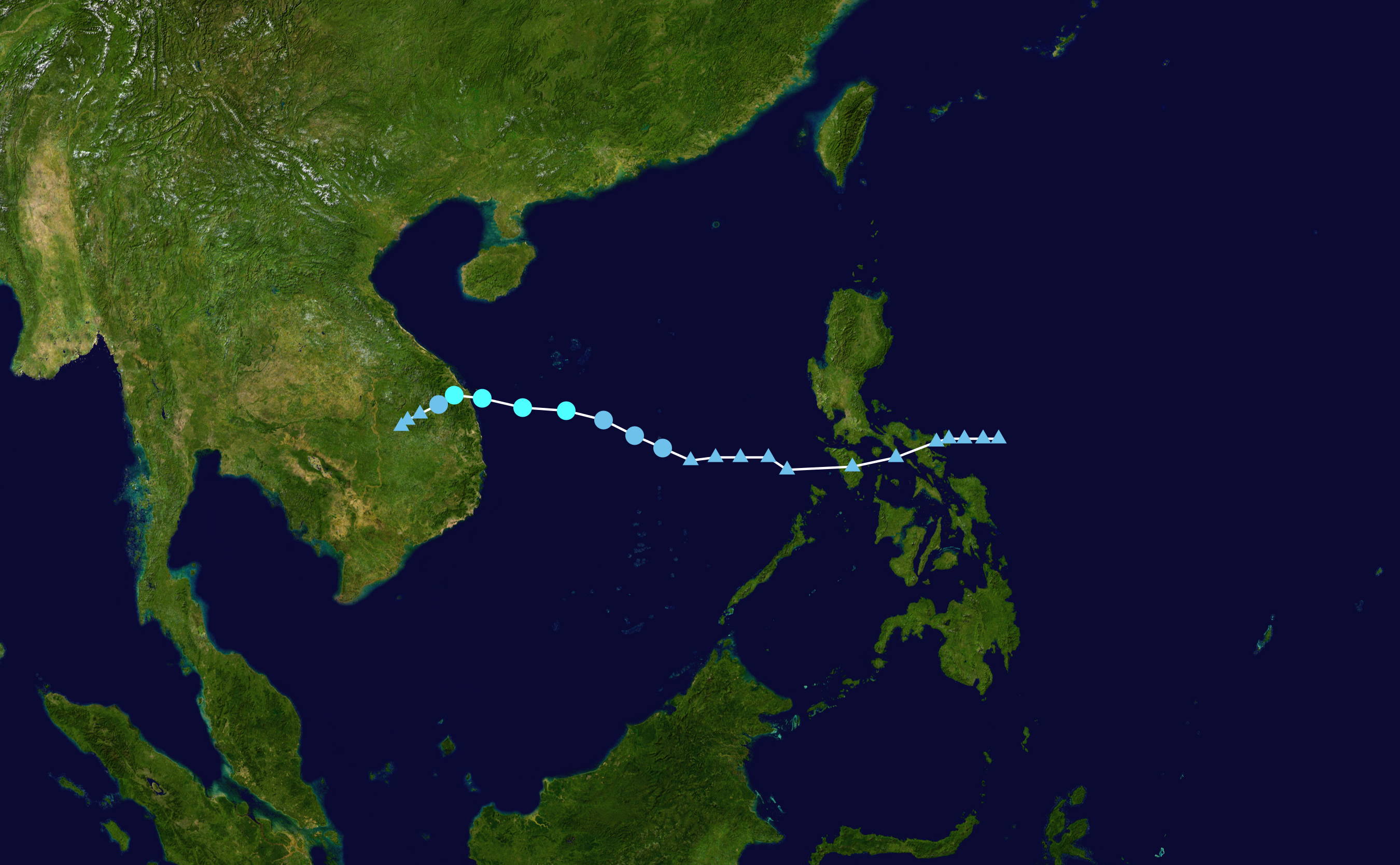
Map plotting the storm's track and intensity, according to the Saffir–Simpson scale Map key Saffir–Simpson scale Tropical depression (≤38 mph, ≤62 km/h) Tropical storm (39–73 mph, 63–118 km/h) Category 1 (74–95 mph, 119–153 km/h) Category 2 (96–110 mph, 154–177 km/h) Category 3 (111–129 mph, 178–208 km/h) Category 4 (130–156 mph, 209–251 km/h) Category 5 (≥157 mph, ≥252 km/h) Unknown Storm type Tropical cyclone Subtropical cyclone Extratropical cyclone, remnant low, tropical disturbance, or monsoon depression

According to post-analytic data by the Japan Meteorological Agency (JMA), Linfa developed as a weak tropical depression just to the east of Bicol Region, Philippines on 18:00 UTC of October 6. After crossing the Philippine archipelago of Luzon and entering the waters of the South China Sea, the Joint Typhoon Warning Center (JTWC) issued a tropical cyclone formation alert on October 9. Shortly thereafter, the JMA began operationally tracking the system around 12:00 UTC that day. Twelve hours later, the JMA started initiating advisories on the developing system. After animated satellite imagery depicted a defined low-level circulation center (LLCC) along with flaring deep convection, the JTWC followed suit on classifying the system as a tropical depression and began issuing advisories, giving the identifier of 17W. Being located in warm sea-surface temperatures and low wind shear, the system's overall structure quickly improved. Due to this, the JTWC upgraded 17W to a tropical storm on 15:00 UTC of October 10. Three hours later, the JMA also upgraded the system to a tropical storm, receiving the name Linfa – the fifteenth named storm of the annual typhoon season.

Linfa slowly consolidated throughout the rest of the day. Microwave imagery depicted continued wrapping of deep convection to its LLCC, which prompted the JTWC to increase Linfa's 1-minute sustained winds to 75 km/h (45 mph). By 00:00 UTC of October 11, Linfa reached its peak intensity with 10-minute sustained winds of 85 km/h (55 mph) and a minimum barometric pressure of 994 hPa (29.35 inHg). However, this peak intensity only lasted for 6 hours. Linfa shortly later made landfall to the south of Da Nang, Vietnam near peak strength. As the storm moved over land, its circulation rapidly deteriorated and became partially exposed; the JTWC issued their final advisory on Linfa on 06:00 UTC of October 11. The JMA analyzed that Linfa weakened back to a tropical depression six hours later, however originally they did not issue their final advisory until 18:00 UTC of the same day. The JMA tracked Linfa until it fully dissipated on 12:00 UTC of October 12.

== Preparations and impact ==
=== Philippines ===
In the Philippines, the precursor to Linfa brought moderate to heavy rain to parts of Luzon and Visayas, with the PAGASA warning of possible flash floods and landslides in the areas affected.

=== Vietnam ===
In preparation for Linfa, Central Vietnamese airports' operation was suspended for much of October 11. Schools were also shut down in Da Nang due to inclement weather approaching from the storm. The National Center for Hydro-Meteorological Forecasting warned of strong tropical-storm force winds extending up to 100 km (62 mi) away from the storm's center.

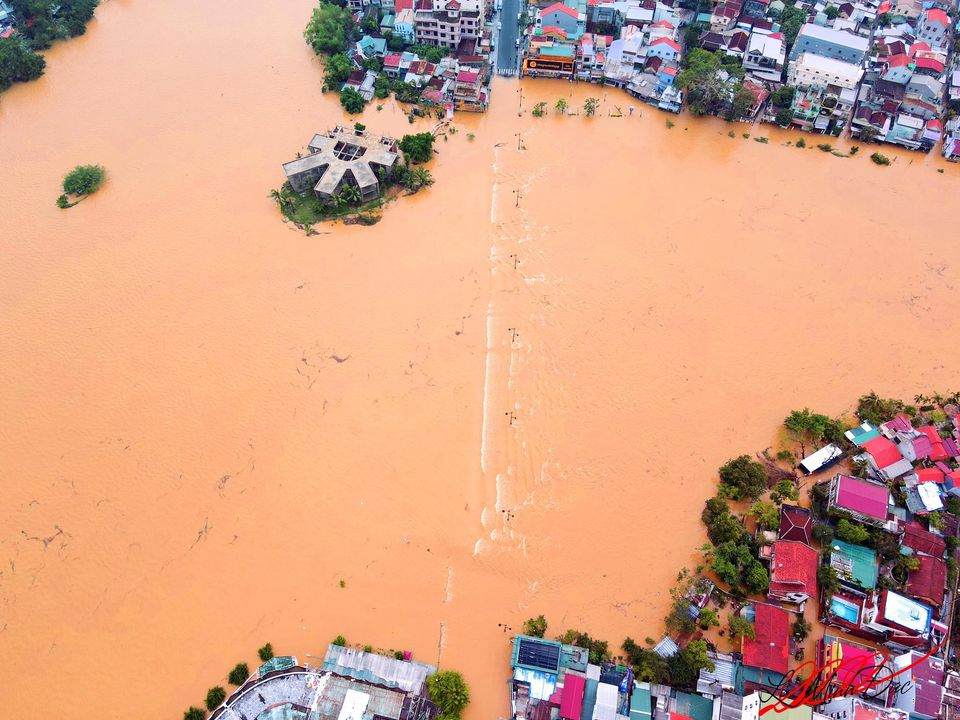
Dap Da Bridge underwater in Hue City, Vietnam

Before Linfa, from October 5 to 8 the areas of central Vietnam had already suffered from very heavy rainfall and flash floods due to the monsoon. Shortly after Linfa had moved inland, the storm brought historic amounts of precipitation to Central Vietnam, the peak rainfall total having been 90.16 inches (2,290 mm) in A Lưới (Huế). Several tornadoes were also reported, one which carved through Thăng Bình District, leaving 20 houses unroofed and 2 people missing. 1,009 houses were completely destroyed by Linfa and 121,694 homes in total were damaged by floods. In addition, the floods caused from Linfa damaged 165.5 km of national highways and 140.1 km of provincial highways. The storm destroyed 6,989 hectares (17,270 acres) of rice crops and vegetable crops, and 2,141 hectares (5,290 acres) of aquaculture, whilst killing about 685,225 livestock. On the night of 12 to 13 October, when leading the rescue team of workers at a hydropower plant (Thua Thien Hue) to find missing workers buried in a landslide, Major General Nguyễn Văn Man was buried in yet another landslide with 12 people from the rescue team. On October 15, their bodies were found by rescuers. The entirety of Ly Son Island, an island with a population of over 22,000 people, was left without power. 2 boats near the island were also destroyed, but the men inside were also rescued by two naval ships. The storm left, in total, 112 people dead and 24 missing in Vietnam.

=== Other regions ===
In Cambodia, heavy floods due to Linfa killed 25 people. The floods were also said to have inundated 73,720 houses and 293,177 hectares of rice and other crops. In combination with Tropical Storm Nangka which hit just days later, 312,224 people were affected.

Prior to the storm, the Ministry of Water Resources and Meteorology warned of river floods and advised to open irrigation gates as rainfall was expected to quickly intensify due to Linfa in Laos. There was one confirmed death and 3 people missing. 7,798 people were displaced.

== Aftermath ==
Quang Tri authorities asked the central government for relief equipment, including two amphibious vehicles, 27 boats, and chemicals for disinfection. The US Ambassador to Vietnam Daniel Kritenbrink announced US$100,000 in relief funds to support recovery in Vietnam. USAID promised to give long-term assistance to disaster relief for the rest of the typhoon season immediately following Linfa.

=== Retirement ===
In the spring of 2022, the Typhoon Committee announced that the name Linfa, alongside 4 other storm names, would be removed from the naming list. The Committee chose Peilou as the replacement for Linfa.

== See also ==
- Weather of 2020
- Tropical cyclones in 2020
- List of wettest tropical cyclones
- Tropical Storm Noul (2020) - another storm that made landfall a few weeks prior in Vietnam and killed more than 18 people
- Tropical Storm Nangka (2020) - another deadly storm that enhanced flooding issues in Vietnam
- September 2009 Vietnam tropical depression – a weak system that affected Vietnam in September 2009.
- October 2017 Vietnam tropical depression - another weak but deadly system made landfall on central Vietnam and killed 109 people in October 2017.
