= Quan Sơn district =

Coordinates: 20.250°N 104.833°E

Quan Sơn district Huyện Quan Sơn
- District
- Interactive map of Quan Sơn district
- Country: Vietnam
- Region: North Central Coast
- Province: Thanh Hóa
- Capital: Quan Sơn

Area
  - Total: 364 sq mi (943 km^{2})

Population (2019)
  - Total: 45,520
- Time zone: UTC+7 (UTC + 7)

Quan Sơn is a former district (huyện) of Thanh Hóa province in the North Central Coast region of Vietnam.

As of 2019 the district had a population of 45,520. The district covers an area of 943 km^{2} (364 sq mi). The district capital lies at Quan Sơn.
