= Nam Trà My =

- Commune
- Location in Vietnam
- Coordinates: 15.148924425613663°N 108.11385814563506°E
- Country: Vietnam
- Region: South Central Coast and Central Highlands
- Municipality: Da Nang
- Established: 16 June 2025

Area
  - Total: 178.31 km^{2} (68.85 sq mi)

Population (2025)
  - Total: 7,395
  - Density: 41/km^{2} (110/sq mi)
- Website: namtramy.danang.gov.vn

Nam Trà My is a commune in the municipality of Da Nang, Vietnam.

On 16 June 2025:

- District-level administrative units nationwide were dissolved.
- The entire area and population of Trà Mai and Trà Don communes, formerly part of Nam Trà My district in Quảng Nam province, were merged to form a new commune named Nam Trà My.
