= Typhoon Vamco =

Pacific typhoon in 2020

Typhoon Vamco (Ulysses)
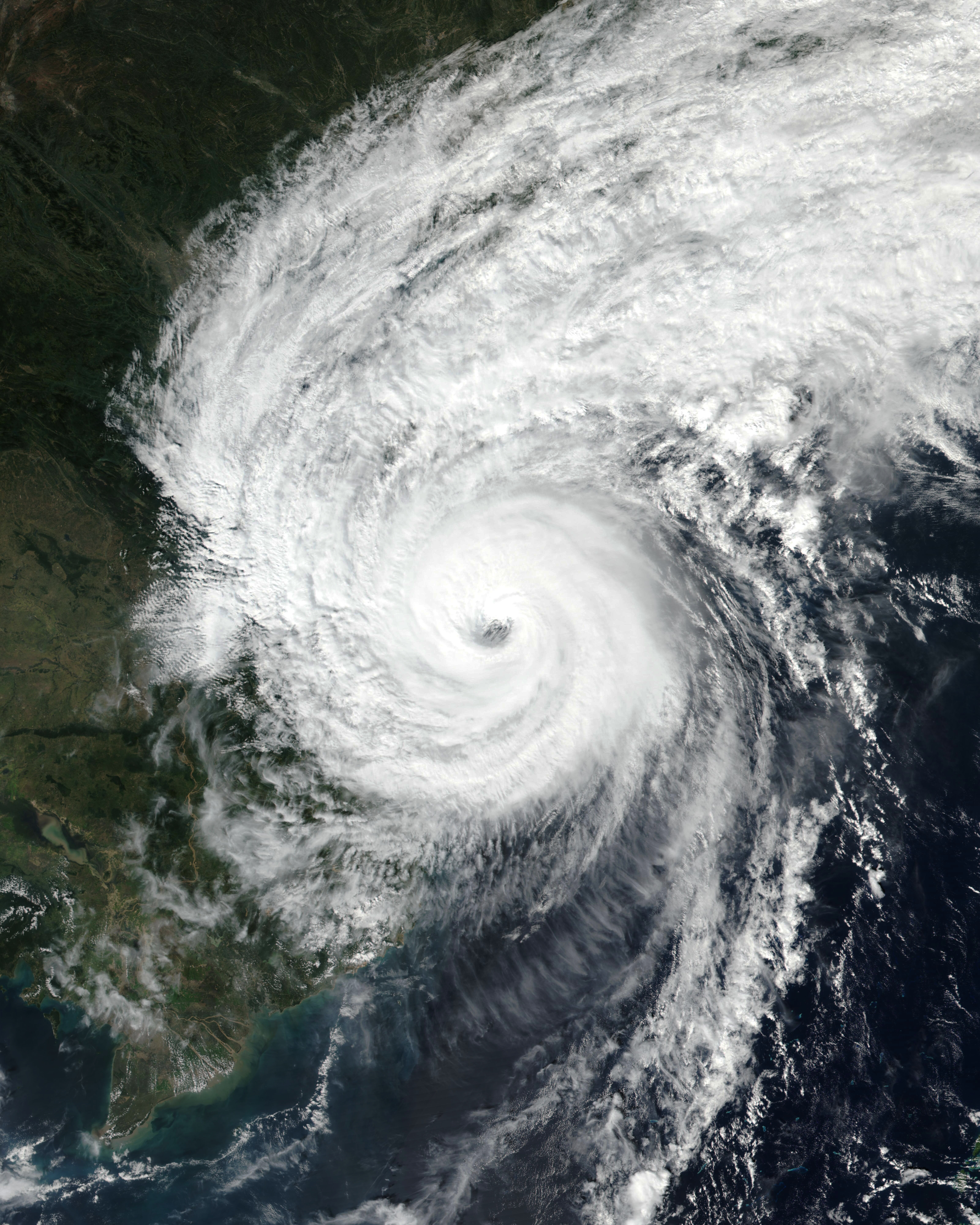
- Vamco approaching landfall in Vietnam on November 14

Meteorological history
- Formed: November 8, 2020
- Dissipated: November 15, 2020

Very strong typhoon
- 10-minute sustained (JMA)
- Highest winds: 155 km/h (100 mph)
- Lowest pressure: 955 hPa (mbar); 28.20 inHg

Category 4-equivalent typhoon
- 1-minute sustained (SSHWS/JTWC)
- Highest winds: 215 km/h (130 mph)
- Lowest pressure: 945 hPa (mbar); 27.91 inHg

Overall effects
- Fatalities: 102
- Injuries: 85
- Missing: 10
- Damage: $1.06 billion (2020 USD)
- Areas affected: Philippines, Vietnam, Laos, Thailand
- IBTrACS
- Part of the 2020 Pacific typhoon season

Typhoon Vamco, (Note: The name Vamco (Vietnamese: Vàm Cỏ, [vaːm˨˩ kɔ˧˩]) was contributed by Vietnam and refers to the Vàm Cỏ River in southern Vietnam.) known in the Philippines as Typhoon Ulysses, was a powerful, deadly, and very destructive Category 4-equivalent typhoon that struck the Philippines and Vietnam in mid-November 2020. It also caused the worst flooding in Metro Manila since Typhoon Ketsana in 2009. The twenty-second named storm and tenth typhoon of the 2020 Pacific typhoon season, Vamco originated as a tropical depression northwest of Palau, where it slowly continued its northwest track until it made landfall in Quezon. After entering the South China Sea, Vamco further intensified in the South China Sea until it made its last landfall in Vietnam.

Vamco made its first landfall in the Philippines near midnight on November 11 in the Quezon province as a Category 2-equivalent typhoon. The typhoon brought heavy rains to Central Luzon and nearby provinces, including Metro Manila, the national capital. As the typhoon crossed the country, dams from all around Luzon neared their spilling points, forcing dam operators to release large amounts of water into their impounds. As the Magat Dam approached its spilling point, all seven of its gates were opened to prevent dam failure, which overflowed the Cagayan River and caused widespread floods in Cagayan and Isabela. After entering the South China Sea, Vamco further intensified until it reached its brief peak as a Category 4-equivalent typhoon. On November 15, Vamco made landfall in Vietnam as a Category 1-equivalent typhoon before dissipating shortly after.

Days after the typhoon had passed the Philippines, rescue operations in the Cagayan Valley were still ongoing due to the unexpected extent of the flooding. In response to the typhoon's effects, the entire landmass of Luzon was placed under a state of calamity. As of December 2, the Philippines' National Disaster Risk Reduction and Management Council had stated that the typhoon had 112 casualties (including 102 validated deaths, and another 10 missing), and the damages caused by Vamco reached ₱20.2 billion (US$418 million).

== Meteorological history ==
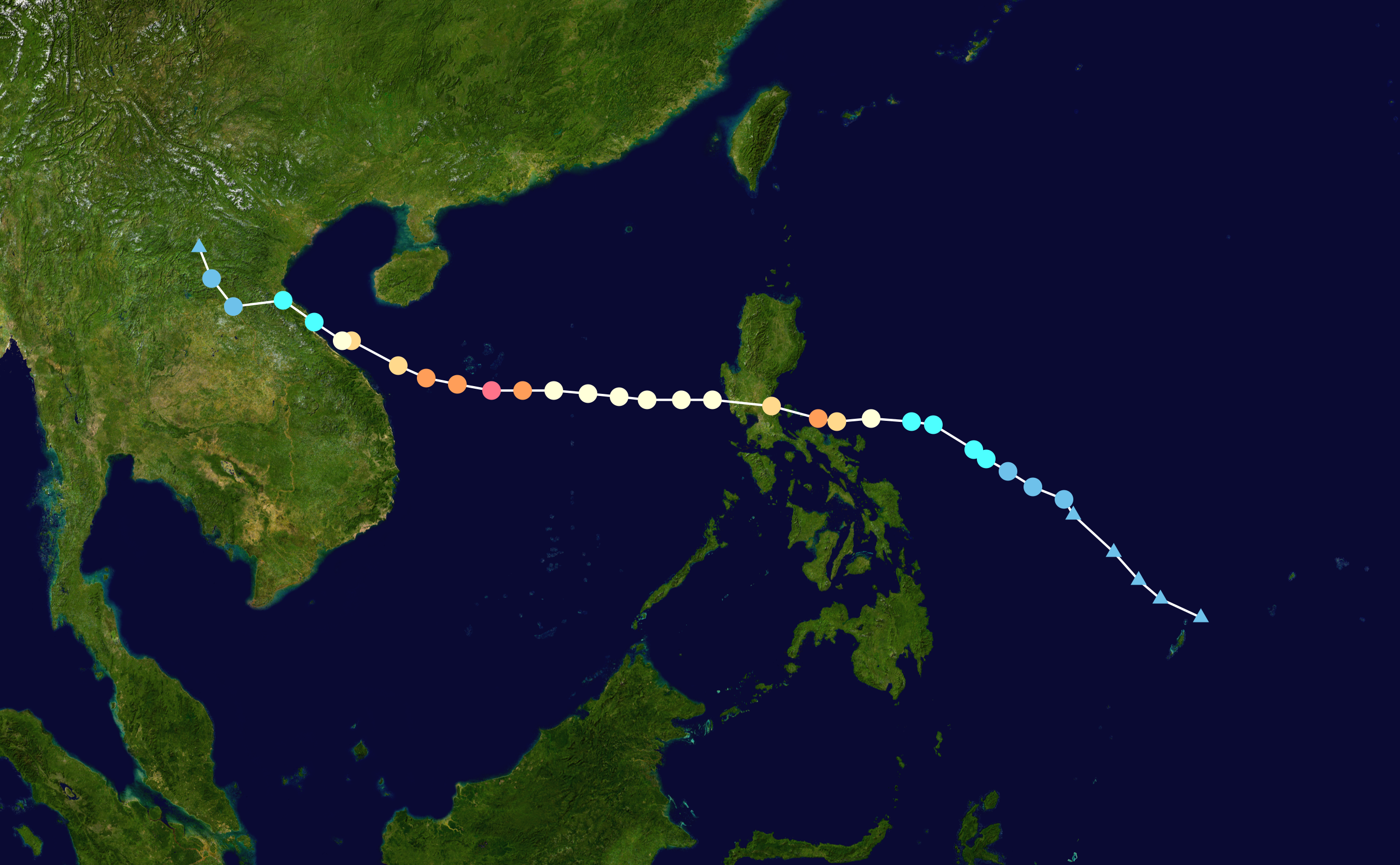
Map plotting the storm's track and intensity, according to the Saffir–Simpson scale Map key Saffir–Simpson scale Tropical depression (≤38 mph, ≤62 km/h) Tropical storm (39–73 mph, 63–118 km/h) Category 1 (74–95 mph, 119–153 km/h) Category 2 (96–110 mph, 154–177 km/h) Category 3 (111–129 mph, 178–208 km/h) Category 4 (130–156 mph, 209–251 km/h) Category 5 (≥157 mph, ≥252 km/h) Unknown Storm type Tropical cyclone Subtropical cyclone Extratropical cyclone, remnant low, tropical disturbance, or monsoon depression

On November 8, the Japan Meteorological Agency (JMA) began tracking a tropical depression 132 nautical miles (245 km; 150 mi) north-northwest of Palau. At 12:00 UTC on the same day, the Philippine Atmospheric, Geophysical and Astronomical Services Administration (PAGASA) declared the system as a tropical depression inside the Philippine Area of Responsibility (PAR) and named it Ulysses. The next day, at 07:15 UTC, the system strengthened into a tropical storm, which JMA named it Vamco, with the Joint Typhoon Warning Center later issuing their first warning on the system as a tropical depression. As the system tracked closer to southern Luzon, both the PAGASA and the JMA upgraded Vamco into a severe tropical storm. Vamco was then upgraded into a typhoon by the JMA on November 11, followed by the JTWC and the PAGASA shortly after. At 22:30 PHT (14:30 UTC) on the same day, Vamco made its first landfall on the island town of Patnanungan in Quezon. Surrounded by favorable conditions for intensification, Vamco continued to strengthen and reached its initial peak of intensity with 10-minute sustained winds of 130 km/h (81 mph), 1-minute sustained winds of 185 km/h (115 mph) and a minimum central pressure of 970 mbar, classifying it as a Category 3-equivalent typhoon. At 23:20 PHT (15:20 UTC) on November 11 and again at 01:40 PHT on November 12 (17:40 UTC), Vamco made two successive landfalls in Quezon, first over Burdeos in Polillo Island and then in General Nakar in Luzon. The storm then weakened below typhoon strength as it moved inland, and by 00:00 UTC, Vamco had emerged over the South China Sea. The typhoon left the PAR at 01:30 UTC, at which point the PAGASA reclassified the system as a typhoon. Vamco gradually intensified over the South China Sea, eventually undergoing rapid intensification to reach its peak as a Category 4-equivalent typhoon on November 13. The typhoon weakened before making its last landfall in Vietnam as a Category 1-equivalent typhoon on November 15. It carried on losing strength after landfall, downgrading to a tropical storm until it dissipated over northern Laos.

== Preparations ==
=== Philippines ===
==== Highest Tropical Cyclone Wind Signal ====
Highest Tropical Cyclone Wind Signal issued by PAGASA for Vamco (Ulysses) in each province. The white line represents the best track.

As Vamco initially formed inside of the Philippine Area of Responsibility, the PAGASA immediately began issuing severe weather bulletins in preparation for the typhoon. The Philippines had recently been hit with three other tropical cyclones — Typhoon Molave (Quinta), Typhoon Goni (Rolly), and Tropical Storm Etau (Tonyo) — making this the fourth tropical cyclone to approach Luzon in the past month. After Goni damaged the PAGASA's Doppler weather radar station in Catanduanes, one of the only three stations in the country, typhoon tracking was done manually. The PAGASA first raised tropical cyclone wind signals as early as November 9. By 23:00 UTC on November 10, the PAGASA had raised a Signal #2 wind signal for 17 provinces, parts of 6 provinces, 2 islands, and the national capital region, Metro Manila. The National Disaster Risk Reduction Management Council (NDRRMC), also began sending out emergency alerts to mobile phone users about possible storm surges. The NDRRMC later used this same system to alert citizens in areas under Signal #3.

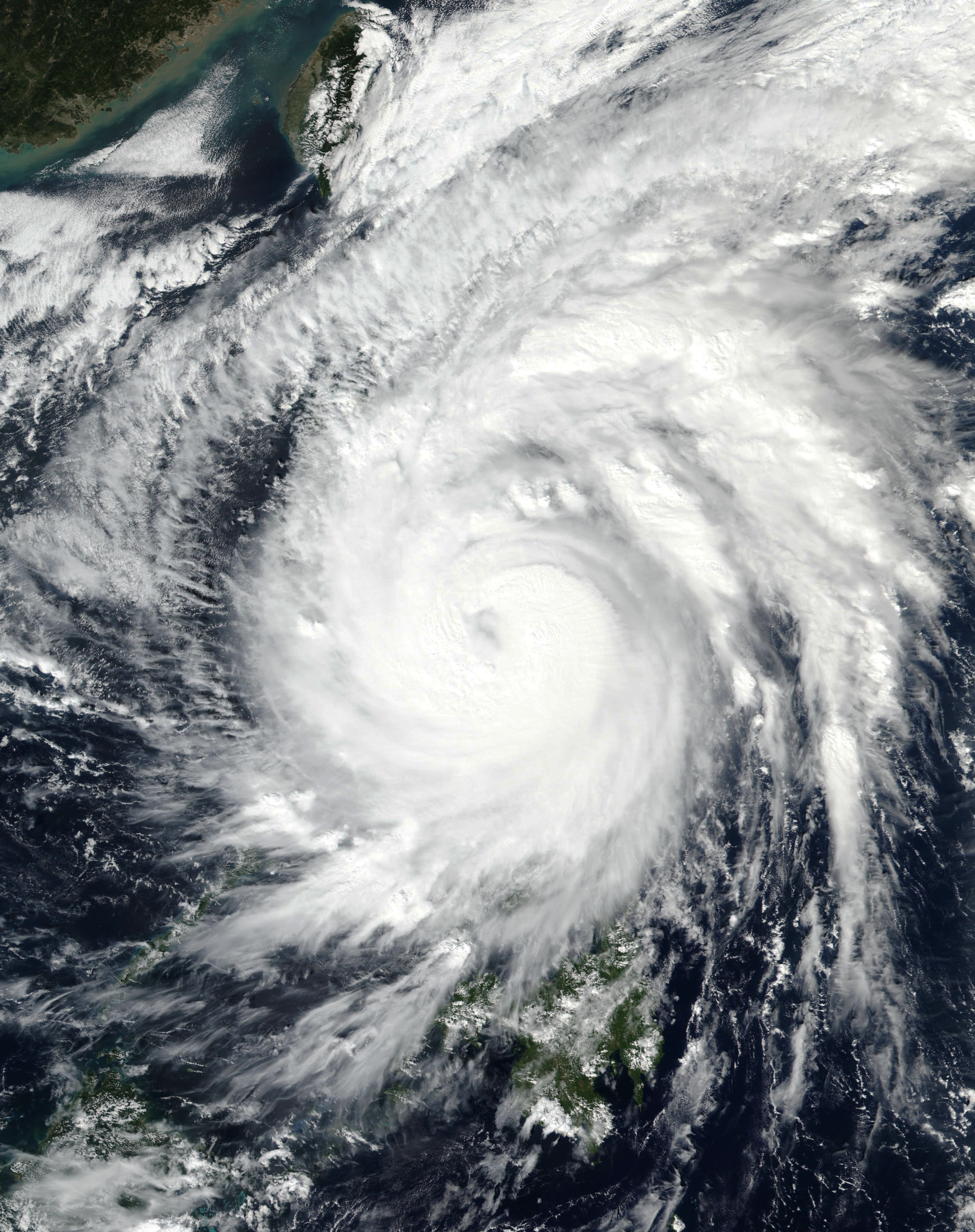
Typhoon Vamco approaching the Philippines on November 11.

Residents in the Pollilo Islands and in Central Luzon were forced to evacuate a day before the storm's landfall. 14,000 residents were also to be evacuated in Camarines Norte. Bicol Region, one of the regions worst hit by Goni last month, evacuated 12,812 individuals ahead of the incoming storm. Over 2,071 passengers were stranded in ports in multiple regions of Luzon as sea conditions worsened. Philippine Airlines suspended flights due to the inclement weather brought by Vamco. The Office of the President of the Philippines suspended work in government offices and online classes in public schools in 7 regions, including the National Capital Region. 12 hours before the typhoon's landfall, the PAGASA raised Signal #3 warnings for areas to be hit by the typhoon on landfall including Metro Manila and the entirety of Central Luzon. The Philippine Institute of Volcanology and Seismology then issued lahar warnings for the Mayon Volcano, the Taal Volcano, and Mount Pinatubo hours prior to the typhoon's landfall. Prior to the typhoon's landfall, at least 231,312 individuals were evacuated by local government units.

Vamco struck while the Philippines was in the middle of the COVID-19 pandemic, and various sections of the country were under different community quarantines.

=== Vietnam ===
On November 14, at least 460,000 people were ordered to evacuate from the coastal areas by the government. On the morning of that same day, all flights in five airports, including Da Nang, Chu Lai, Phu Bai, Dong Hoi and Vinh were ordered to be suspended or delayed.

== Impact ==
Vamco impacted the Philippines and Vietnam just a few days after the strike of Typhoon Goni. Both countries were still attempting to recover from Goni's initial impact, but Vamco went on to quickly exceed Goni's record as the sixth-costliest Philippine typhoon on record; in total both typhoons caused ₱37.2 billion (US$770 million) in damage in the Philippines alone.

=== Philippines ===
Costliest Philippine typhoons
Rank	Storm	Season	Damage		Ref.
Rank	Storm	Season	PHP	USD	Ref.
1	Yolanda (Haiyan)	2013	₱95.5 billion	$2.98 billion	
2	Odette (Rai)	2021	₱51.7 billion	$968 million	
3	Glenda (Rammasun)	2014	₱38.6 billion	$771 million	
4	Pablo (Bopha)	2012	₱36.9 billion	$724 million	
5	Ompong (Mangkhut)	2018	₱33.9 billion	$627 million	
6	Pepeng (Parma)	2009	₱27.3 billion	$591 million	
7	Ulysses (Vamco)	2020	₱20.2 billion	$420 million	
8	Crising (Wipha)	2025	₱18.4 billion	$373 million	
9	Kristine (Trami)	2024	₱18.4 billion	$373 million	
10	Rolly (Goni)	2020	₱17.9 billion	$371 million	

Even before the typhoon's landfall, Catanduanes had already experienced heavy rains, causing floods and rockslides in the province. Flood waters were reported to reach the roofs of some houses in Bagamanoc.

Several areas in Luzon, including Metro Manila, reported that they experienced power outages prior to the typhoon making landfall. The Philippine Stock Exchange was closed on November 12 due to the typhoon.

Emergency hotlines in some locations became unavailable because most emergency numbers provided by national agencies and local governments were landline phone numbers, which were difficult to call from mobile phones, and became totally inaccessible once telephone lines in the localities were brought down by the storm. The PAGASA's own phone lines went down due to technical problems on the morning of November 12, going back up a few hours later. Broadcast news coverage had been significantly reduced compared to typhoons in previous years as a result of the shutdown of the ABS-CBN broadcast network, which had local news bureaus and strong signal reach in provinces far from Manila. The shutdown caused an information gap among areas which could only receive the network's signals. Social media filled in some of the information gap, with some residents and even local governments treating it as a de facto emergency hotline.

In the early hours of November 12, local government officials began reporting that their local rescue capabilities were already overwhelmed, and that they needed help from the national government in the form of airlift support and help from the Philippine Coast Guard. After attending an online ASEAN summit that morning, Philippine President Rodrigo Duterte addressed the nation via a pre-taped broadcast on state-owned television network People's Television Network (PTV), saying that he wanted to visit the storm-hit constituencies, but that he was constrained by his security personnel and doctor from doing so because of the risk to his safety and health. Actor Jericho Rosales and digital creative Kim Jones resorted to using their surfboards to rescue stranded citizens in Marikina. 52 national roads in 7 regions were damaged due to the typhoon's effects.

As of January 13, 2021, the NDRRMC reported 98 deaths and 19 missing caused by Vamco. Economic loss in infrastructure were at ₱12.9 billion (US$266 million) while damage to agriculture reached ₱7.32 billion (US$151 million). Total damage across the country stood at ₱20.2 billion (US$417 million). The Cagayan Valley experienced the highest total amount of damage. At least 5,184,824 individuals were affected by the typhoon's onslaught. The Armed Forces of the Philippines and Philippine National Police reportedly rescued 265,339 and 104,850 individuals, respectively. Contrary to the NDRRMC's report, Marikina officials report an unofficial damage of ₱40 billion (US$824 million).

==== River floods ====
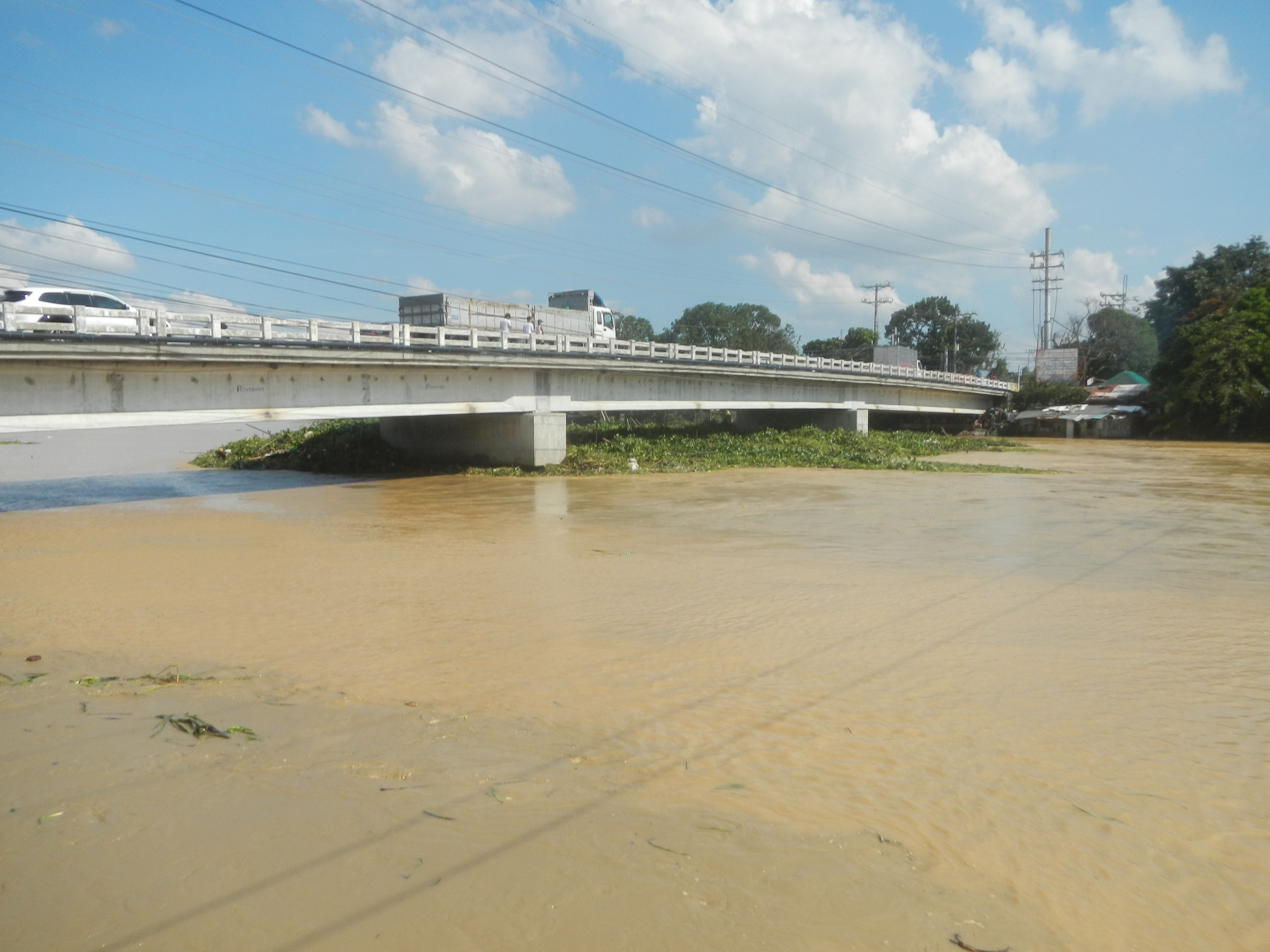
Flooding along the Angat River in Calumpit.

The Marikina River surpassed the water levels reached by Typhoon Ketsana in 2009, which brought massive rainfall and caused severe flooding. By 11:00 PHT on November 12, the river's water level had risen to 22 metres (72 ft), submerging most parts of the city in flood waters, according to the Marikina Public Information Office. Marikina Mayor Marcelino Teodoro declared the city under a state of calamity due the massive floods brought by the typhoon. Government scientists and advocacy sector conservationists warned that the flooding on the Marikina River was a consequence of the severe deforestation of the Upper Marikina River Watershed in Rizal province, where illegal logging, illegal quarrying, and landgrabbing continued to be a problem.

In Pampanga, 86 villages experienced flooding due to the swelling of the Pampanga River.

==== Dam overflow ====
Dams in the affected areas, including La Mesa Dam, Angat Dam, Binga Dam, Magat Dam, Ipo Dam, and Caliraya Dam, reached their maximum levels on November 12, forcing them to begin releasing water.

By November 13, a water level of 192.7 metres (632 ft), 0.3 meters below the dam's spilling point, forced the Magat Dam to continue releasing water. All seven gates of the dam were opened at 24 meters as the dam released over 5,037 cubic metres (1,331,000 US gal) of water into the Cagayan River as numerous riverside towns experienced massive flooding. Local governments continuously conducted rescue operations in their areas but had run out of equipment and manpower to rescue. Because there was very little media coverage of the flooding in the area, residents resorted to social media to request the national government for rescue. Waters under the Buntun Bridge went up as high as 13 meters, flooding the nearby barangays up to the roofs of houses. Rescue efforts continued into the early hours of November 14, but low visibility made aerial rescue efforts impossible until daylight. Cagayan and Isabela subsequently declared a state of calamity.

Following the severe flooding in the Cagayan Valley, experts called the valley the most flood-prone area in the country. The National Irrigation Administration was criticized for releasing water from the Magat Dam, which allegedly made the situation worse.

=== Vietnam ===
Vamco began affecting Central Vietnam around midnight ICT on November 15. On the islands near the coast of Vietnam, a weather station on Cồn Cỏ Island recorded a 2-minute sustained wind speed of 36 m/s (130 km/h; 81 mph) with gusts reaching 42 m/s (151 km/h; 94 mph), while a station on Lý Sơn Island recorded a 2-minute sustained wind speed of 22 m/s (79 km/h; 49 mph) with gusts up to 32 m/s (115 km/h; 72 mph). On mainland Vietnam, the observation station in Tân Mỹ (Quảng Bình) recorded a 2-minute sustained wind speed of 24 m/s (86 km/h; 54 mph) and gusts of 35 m/s (126 km/h; 78 mph), while several other stations recorded sustained winds and gusts at tropical storm-force. In the city of Da Nang, the storm surge destroyed many sea embankments, while washing rocks and debris onshore and into the streets. Power outages affected 411,252 people in six central provinces. A person was killed in Thừa Thiên-Huế Province, and economic loss in Quảng Bình Province reached 450 billion đồng (US$19.4 million).

== Aftermath ==
=== Philippines ===
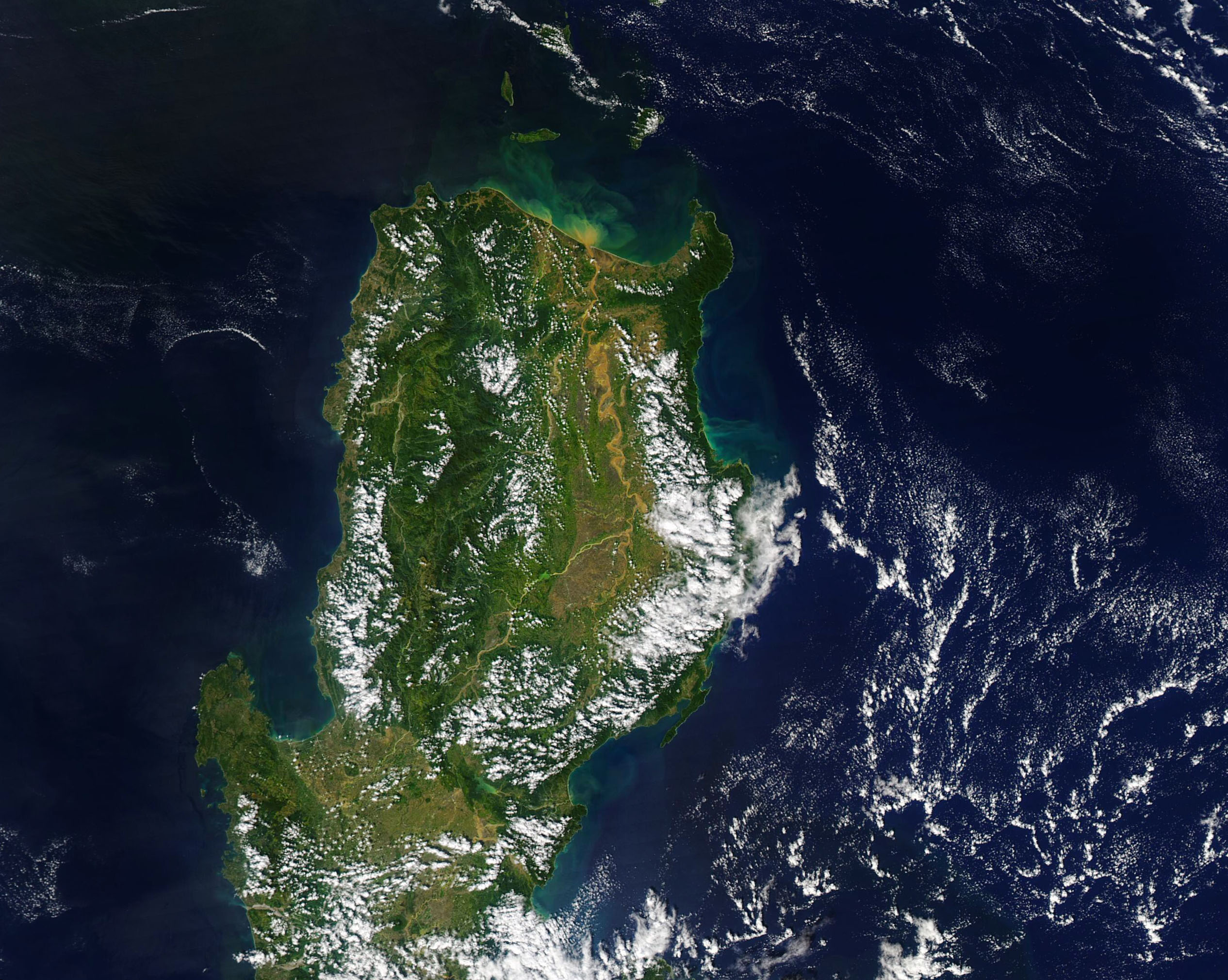
Satellite image of Northern Luzon after the onslaught of Typhoon Vamco, with noticeable flooding in the Cagayan Valley region.

Even after the typhoon had passed, widespread flooding from the typhoon's rains and from nearly overflowed dams wreaked havoc on the country days after its landfall. Despite causing heavy floods, according to the PAGASA, Vamco released less rain that Typhoon Ketsana, another typhoon in 2009 which caused similar floods. In response to the typhoon's effects, the entire landmass of Luzon was placed under a state of calamity.

==== Public reactions to government response ====
Tuguegarao Mayor Jefferson Soriano drew criticism after a photo on social media showed him celebrating his birthday in Batangas while Tuguegarao was inundated by floods. Soriano regretted the trip, and stated that he underestimated the effects of the typhoon as no storm signals have were raised when he left for Batangas. Soriano attempted to return to Tuguegarao on November 12, a day after the typhoon's first landfall, however the North Luzon Expressway had already been blocked due to the typhoon. He has been ordered to explain his absence to the Department of the Interior and Local Government, according to the department spokesman.

Online discussion sparked regarding the Congress of the Philippines' budget cuts of ₱4 billion (US$83 million) to the NDRRMC during deliberations on the 2020 national budget, along with the closure of Project NOAH, a disaster prevention and mitigation tool, in 2017 by the Department of Science and Technology, citing the lack of funds. Vice President Leni Robredo called for investigations after suspected oversights in disaster preparedness. Robredo stated that estimates on the possibility of flooding should be provided when a dam's gates are opened for public awareness. The House of Representatives of the Philippines has since filed for a probe into the circumstances which led to the severe flooding in Cagayan and Isabela.

Citizens on social media demanded accountability from the government, along with President Rodrigo Duterte, who had not made any appearance to the public during the typhoon's onslaught. Presidential Spokesperson Harry Roque later defended the president's whereabouts, citing that the president "is always on top of things." Roque denied shortcomings in preparation, however admitted that authorities "did not expect the gravity of the amount of water that descended on the lowlands." Roque also blamed multiple factors for the flooding, including climate change, deforestation, and illegal mining. Duterte also defended local government units in their disaster response measures.

As a result of the shutdown of the ABS-CBN broadcast network, an information gap was formed among remote areas which could only receive the network's signals. This was raised by citizens on social media, and by Robredo as well. Roque has since denied the existence of this gap.

In a televised briefing for the typhoon, Duterte made sex jokes on-air with other government executives, to the dismay of the public. Gabriela Women's Party representative Arlene Brosas criticized Duterte's audacity to make "inappropriate jokes when people literally drowned and died due to the series of calamities," and that the citizens needed an "effective leadership and a concrete plan." Roque defended Duterte's comments, saying that he was trying to "lighten the mood" after witnessing multiple consecutive tragedies and that the jokes were Duterte's way of coping with disasters.

==== Effects on education ====
Due to the COVID-19 pandemic, the Department of Education (DepEd) required that classes be conducted through "modular learning", which involved the use of both online resources and printed self-learning materials dubbed "modules" for classes in public schools. While citizens evacuated from flooded areas, some students reported losing their modules due to the flood waters. DepEd Secretary Leonor Briones was heavily criticized for saying that schools should solve the problem of damaged modules on their own by drying the modules with the sun or a flat iron. The DepEd later stated that they will replace the damaged modules through additional funds provided by its central office.

In the aftermath of the typhoon, beginning November 15, some universities in the Philippines, including the Ateneo de Manila University, De La Salle University, Polytechnic University of the Philippines, and University of Santo Tomas, eased the academic workload for their students. Synchronous sessions through online videoconferencing were temporarily suspended, and deadlines for requirements were moved to succeeding weeks.

The Pasig government suspended classes from preschool to senior high school in both public and private schools for November 16 and 17. Quezon City officials also declared the suspension of online classes from kinder to senior high school on the same days. Marikina, after experiencing massive floods across the entire city, suspended classes in all levels until December 16.

== Retirement ==
During the season, the PAGASA announced that they retired the name Ulysses from its naming lists due to its significant impacts in Central and Southern Luzon and it will never be used again for another name within the Philippine Area of Responsibility (PAR); It was replaced by Upang for the 2024 season.

After the season, the Typhoon Committee announced that the name Vamco were retired from the naming lists. In 2022, Bang-Lang was selected as the replacement for Vamco.

== See also ==
- Weather of 2020
- Tropical cyclones in 2020
- List of Philippine typhoons (2000–present)
