= Tropical Storm Nangka (2020) =

Pacific tropical storm in 2020

Tropical Storm Nangka (Nika)
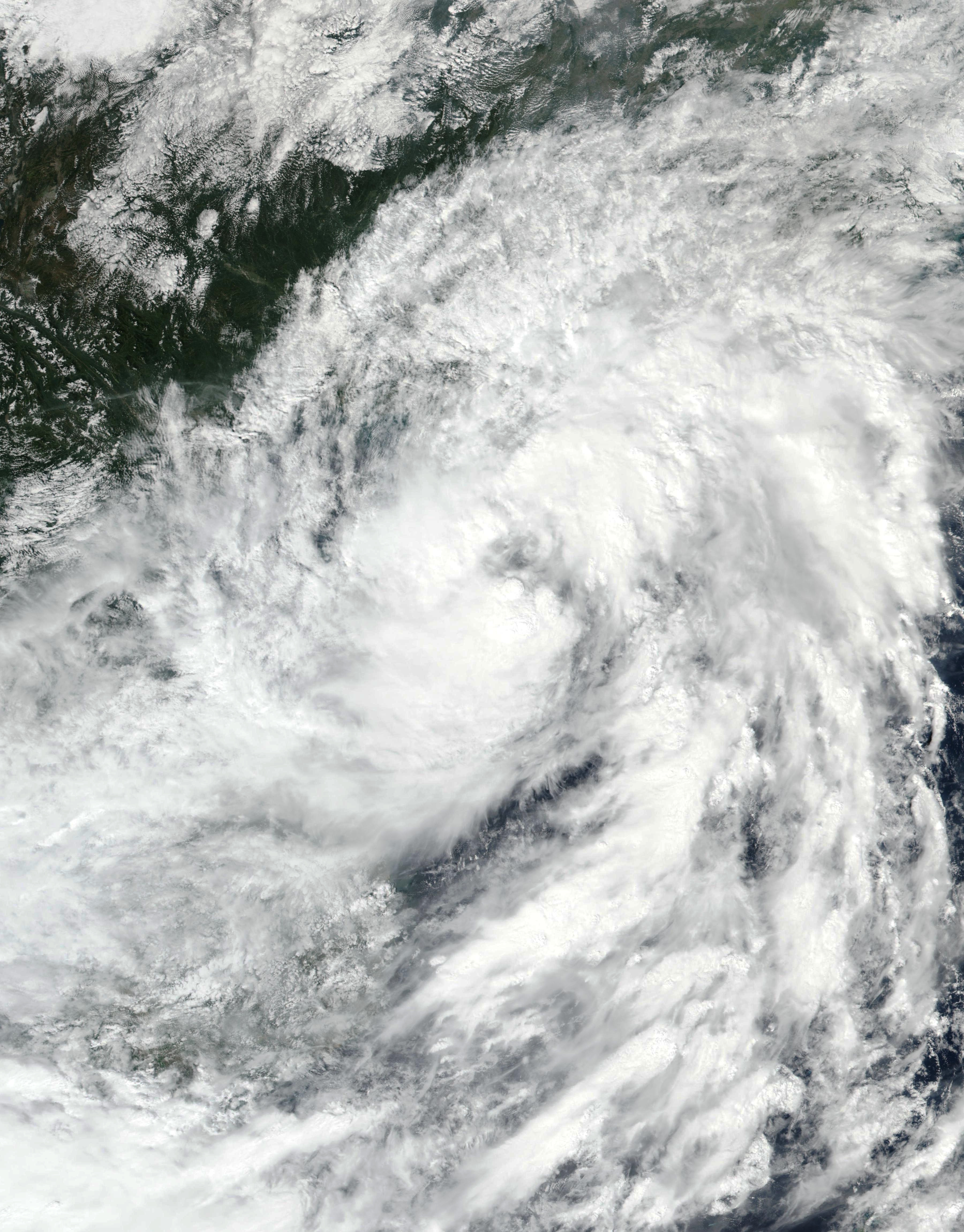
- Nangka approaching Vietnam on October 3

Meteorological history
- Formed: October 11, 2020
- Dissipated: October 13, 2020

Tropical storm
- 10-minute sustained (JMA)
- Highest winds: 85 km/h (50 mph)
- Lowest pressure: 990 hPa (mbar); 29.23 inHg

Tropical storm
- 1-minute sustained (SSHWS/JTWC)
- Highest winds: 95 km/h (60 mph)
- Lowest pressure: 989 hPa (mbar); 29.21 inHg

Overall effects
- Fatalities: 4 total
- Missing: 5
- Damage: $16.9 million (2020 USD)
- Areas affected: China; Laos; Thailand; Philippines; Vietnam
- IBTrACS
- Part of the 2020 Pacific typhoon season

Tropical Storm Nangka, (Note: The name Nangka (Malay: nangka, [ˈnaŋ.ka]) was contributed by Malaysia and means jackfruit (Artocarpus heterophyllus) in Malay.) known in the Philippines as Tropical Depression Nika, was a weak tropical cyclone which went down as the wettest tropical cyclone in the Western Pacific on record, producing 3,245 mm (127.8 in) of rainfall in Hướng Hóa, Vietnam. Nangka would impact Hainan and parts of Indochina, which had been affected by Tropical Storm Linfa just days earlier. Nangka in total caused 4 deaths and 5 missing in China and Vietnam.

== Meteorological history ==
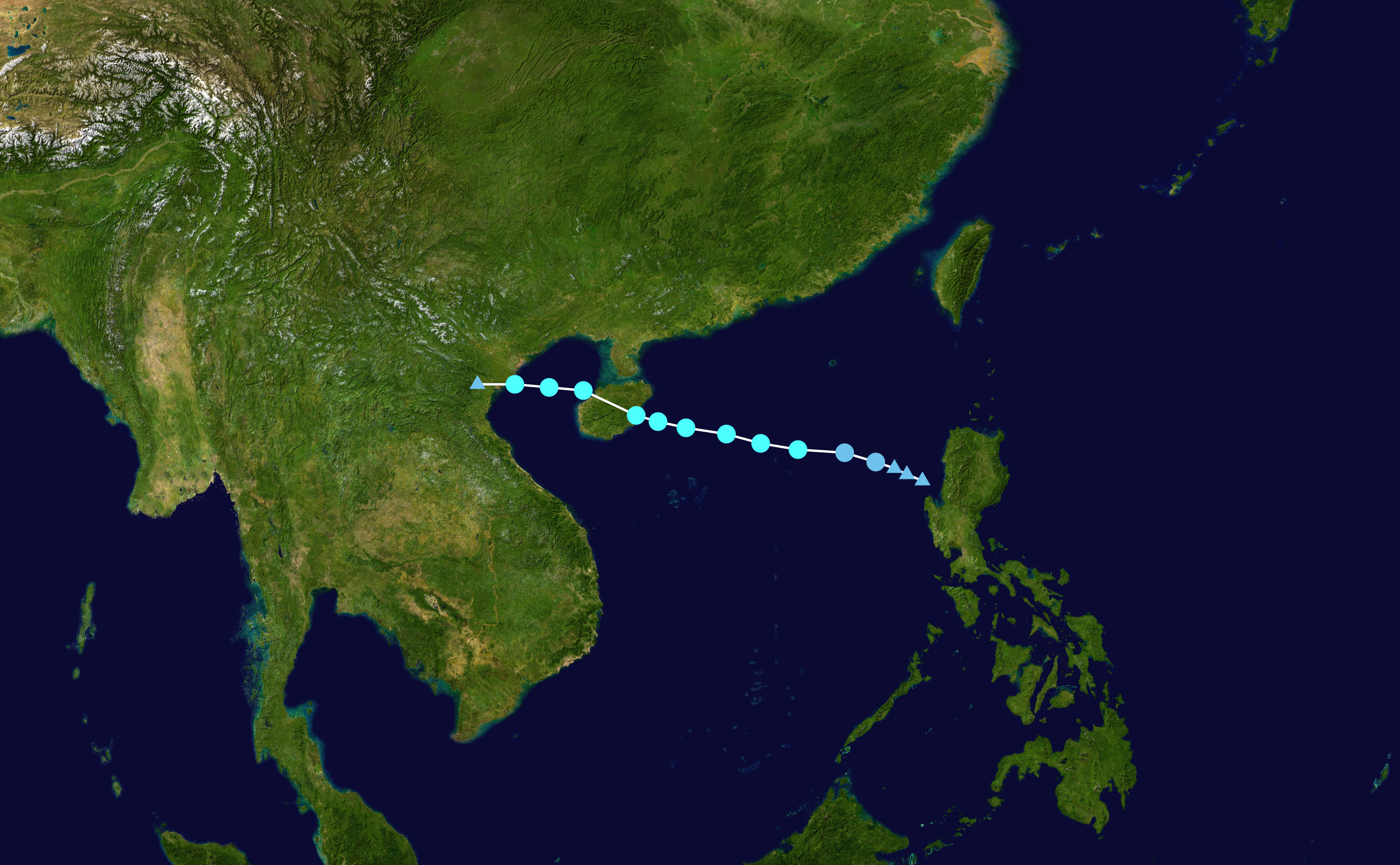
Map plotting the storm's track and intensity, according to the Saffir–Simpson scale Map key Saffir–Simpson scale Tropical depression (≤38 mph, ≤62 km/h) Tropical storm (39–73 mph, 63–118 km/h) Category 1 (74–95 mph, 119–153 km/h) Category 2 (96–110 mph, 154–177 km/h) Category 3 (111–129 mph, 178–208 km/h) Category 4 (130–156 mph, 209–251 km/h) Category 5 (≥157 mph, ≥252 km/h) Unknown Storm type Tropical cyclone Subtropical cyclone Extratropical cyclone, remnant low, tropical disturbance, or monsoon depression

On October 11, 2020, the Japan Meteorological Agency (JMA) began tracking a tropical depression off the west coast of Luzon. The PAGASA declared the system as a tropical depression at 12:00 UTC, and since the storm formed inside of the Philippine Area of Responsibility (PAR) the agency named the system Nika. On the same day at 21:00, the Joint Typhoon Warning Center began issuing warnings on the system. On October 12, the system was declared a tropical storm by the JMA, and was named Nangka. At 9:00, the system left the PAR and the PAGASA issued its final bulletin on the system. At 19:20 CST (11:20 UTC) on October 13, Nangka made landfall over Qionghai, Hainan. The system continued tracking westward, returning to open water, before making a second landfall in Ninh Bình, Vietnam on October 14. As the system tracked further inland, it dissipated over Laos on the same day.

== Preparations and impact ==
=== Philippines ===
The combined effects of Nangka and the southwest monsoon brought rainfall over much of the country. Gale warnings were issued over much of the Luzon coastline, with sea travel being described as risky by the PAGASA. Parts of Metro Manila were flooded, with some parts of EDSA becoming impassable for some vehicles due to sidewalk-high floodwaters.

=== Hong Kong ===
Stock markets, schools, and businesses were closed in Hong Kong. The Hong Kong Observatory issued a Signal No. 8 warning for the area when the cyclone was 450 kilometres (280 mi; 240 nmi) away from the Observatory, making it the furthest Signal No. 8 warning from Hong Kong since Typhoon Mary in 1960 before it was beaten by Lionrock the following year.

=== Mainland China ===
After the passage of Nangka over Hainan Island, 2 people died and 4 are missing as a result of a capsized boat. The economic loss was ¥94 million (US$14 million).

=== Vietnam ===
Nangka making landfall in northern Vietnam on October 14.

In preparation for Nangka more than 150,000 people in Vietnam were evacuated from their homes. Some Vietnamese provinces banned vessels from heading out to sea during the storm. Vinh Airport in Nghe An Province and Tho Xuan Airport in Thanh Hoa Province were closed on October 14. Vietnam Airlines and Pacific Airlines announced that eight flights were cancelled to the two airports. Wind gust packed 120 km/h (75 mph) was reported in Nam Định. Some areas in Northern Vietnam received heavy rainfall, such as 16.18 in (411 mm) in Yên Bái, 14.76 in (375 mm) in Quảng Ninh as of October 16. In totals, the storm caused 2 deaths and 1 missing in Vietnam. Damage in Nam Định Province valued at VND 68 billion (US$2.94 million).

== See also ==
- Weather of 2020
- Tropical cyclones in 2020
- Tropical Storm Mujigae (2009)
- Typhoon Parma (2009)
- Tropical Storm Mirinae (2016)
- Tropical Storm Son-Tinh (2018)
- Tropical Storm Sinlaku (2020) – a storm that had a similar track two months before.
