= 1959 Pacific typhoon season =

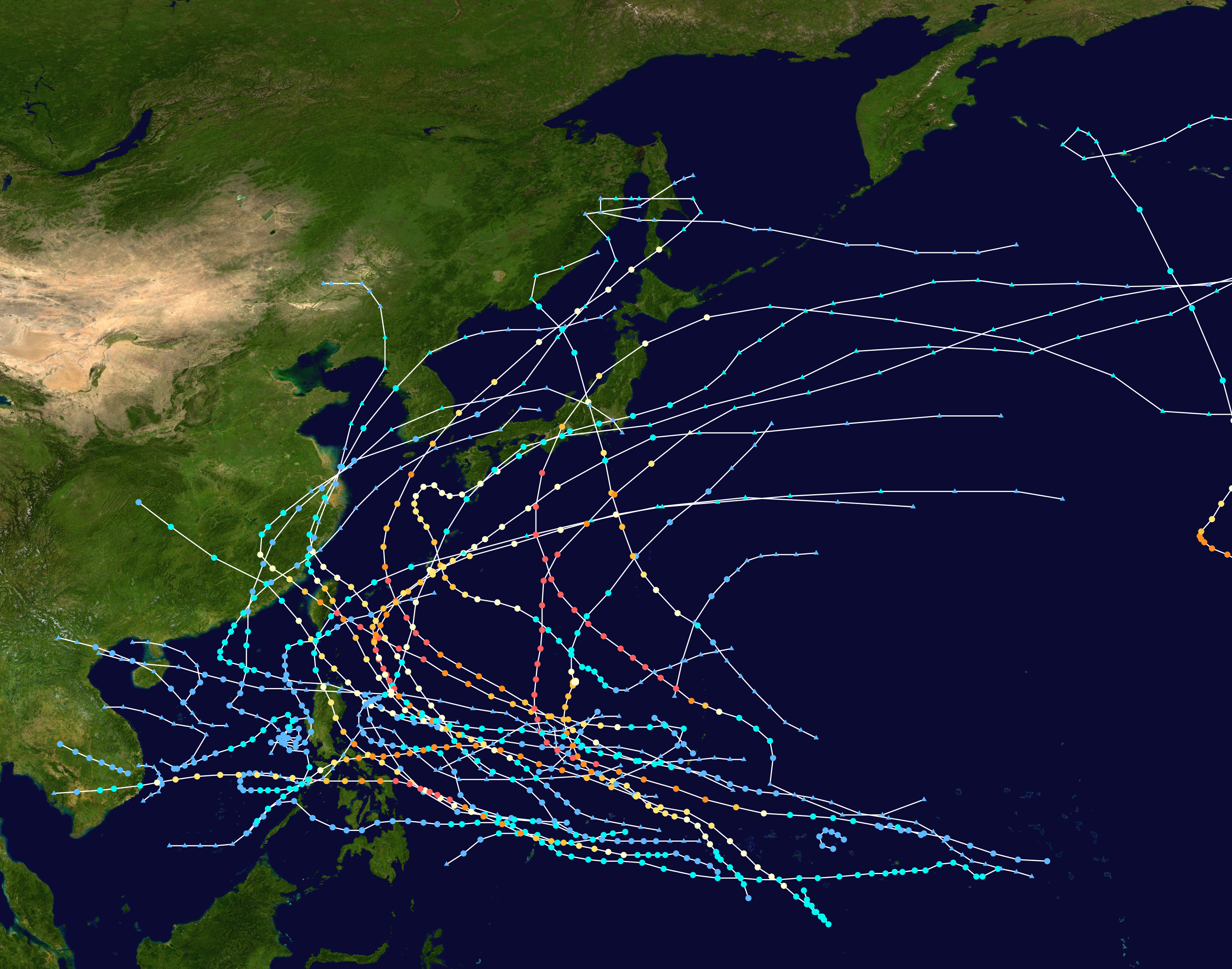
- Season summary map

Seasonal boundaries
- First system formed: February 27, 1959
- Last system dissipated: January 2, 1960

Strongest storm
- Name: Joan
  - Maximum winds: 315 km/h (195 mph) (1-minute sustained)
  - Lowest pressure: 885 hPa (mbar)

Seasonal statistics
- Total depressions: 33
- Total storms: 25
- Typhoons: 18
- Very strong typhoons: 8 (unofficial)
- Total fatalities: > 8,557
- Total damage: > $755 million (1959 USD)

Related articles
- 1959 Atlantic hurricane season; 1959 Pacific hurricane season; 1950s North Indian Ocean cyclone seasons

The 1959 Pacific typhoon season was regarded as one of the most devastating years for Pacific typhoons on record, with China, Japan and South Korea sustaining catastrophic losses. It was an event in the annual cycle of tropical cyclone formation. The season had no official bounds, but tropical cyclones in the Western Pacific Ocean normally develop between May and October.

The scope of this article is limited to the Pacific Ocean, north of the equator and west of the International Date Line. Storms that form east of the Date Line and north of the equator are called hurricanes; see 1959 Pacific hurricane season. All typhoons were assigned a name and number. Tropical storms and tropical depressions formed in the entire west Pacific basin were assigned a name and number by the Joint Typhoon Warning Center, but the latter was not added if no reconnaissance missions were assigned. Systems handled by the responsibility of the United States Weather Bureau (USWB) and Fleet Weather Center (FWC) featured no number.

The 1959 Pacific typhoon season featured 24 tropical cyclones, though operationally 59 total areas of investigation were classified by the Joint Typhoon Warning Center (JTWC); three systems were handled by the responsibility of FWC at Pearl Harbor and the USWB at Honolulu. Three systems were questionable due to lack of reconnaissance aircraft use. In total, the season featured 65 tropical cyclones and areas of investigation operationally, including central Pacific Hurricane Patsy, which was operationally believed to have crossed the International Date Line into the western Pacific. The first annual tropical cyclone report for the western North Pacific Ocean was issued by the agency.

== Season summary ==
Of the 33 tropical cyclones and 65 total areas of investigation, 18 storms attained typhoon status, which was below the yearly average of 19. At least nine other tropical systems never exceeded tropical storm intensity operationally. Most of the systems were noted to have developed within the typical spawning grounds for typhoons originating from easterly waves within the Intertropical Convergence Zone; the exceptions were Ellen and Georgia which developed from cold-core troughs extending southward into the tropical latitudes. Of the 18 typhoons that formed, five were first detected within 300 miles (480 km) of the island of Guam. Three of the typhoons developed at a slow rate, while three others rapidly intensified to typhoon status within hours. Only four typhoons were small in diameter, while at least three typhoons developed to large sizes and became the dominant tropical features during the season. Two of the typhoons — Joan and Vera — featured sea-level pressures below 900 millibars and were the most intense tropical cyclones during the season, each featuring winds of 190 mph (305 km/h) or greater. Of the total number of typhoons, 215 reconnaissance missions were flown into the storms, including 3,799 observations and 391 total fixes. The average track error for each advisory for storms during the season was 63.9 miles (102.8 km) for 12-hour forecasts and 301.6 miles (485.4 km) for 48-hour forecasts.

== Systems ==
=== Tropical Storm Ruby ===
- Tropical storm (JMA)
- Tropical storm (SSHWS)
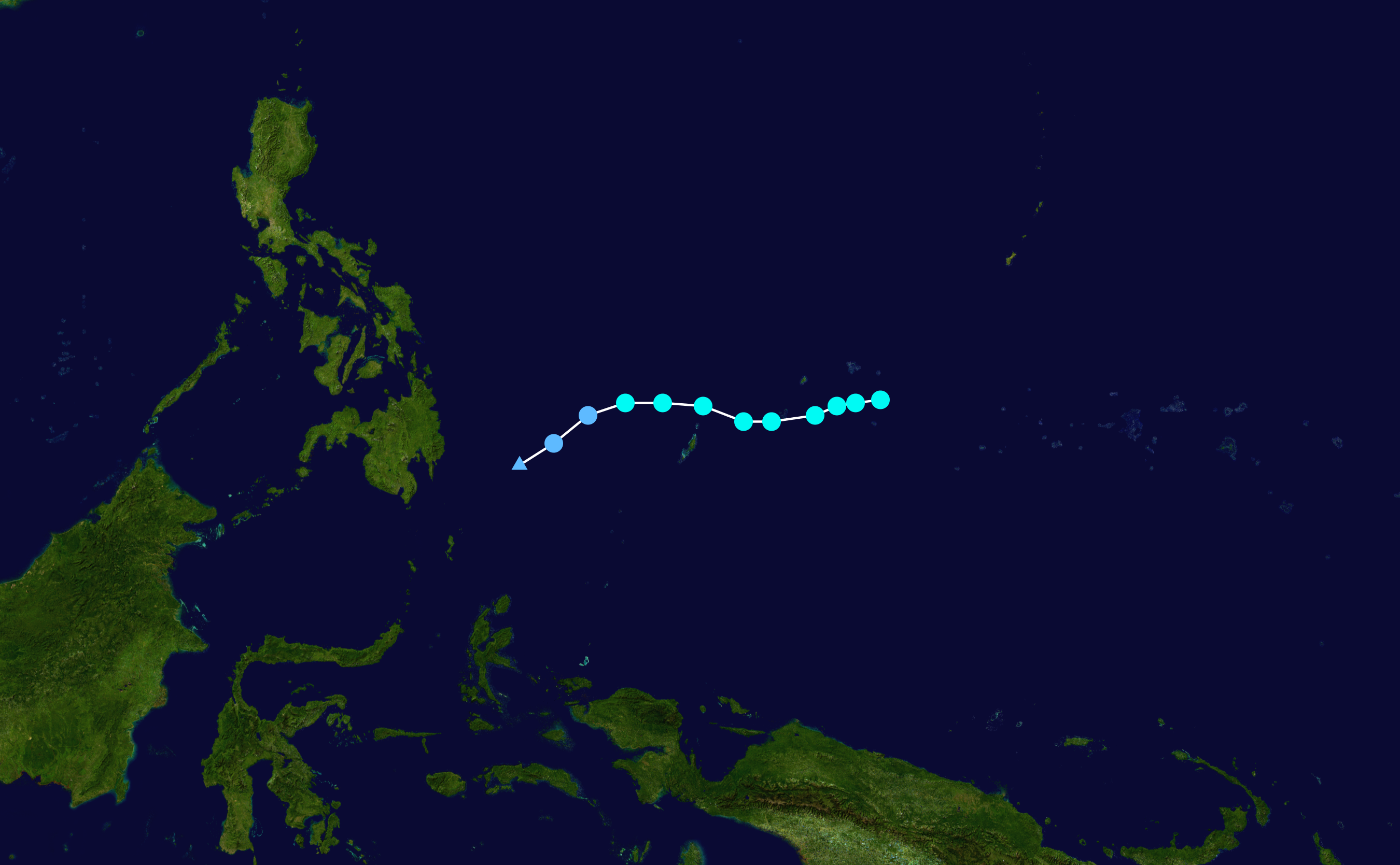
- Duration: February 27 – March 1
- Peak intensity: 95 km/h (60 mph) (1-min); 998 hPa (mbar)

The first tropical storm of the season was detected on February 27 about 300 miles (480 km) south of Yap with winds of 60 miles per hour (97 km/h). Moving erratically westward, Ruby maintained intensity until it passed 90 miles (140 km) south of Palau on February 28, when it began to weaken and move to the west-northwest. Ruby weakened to below tropical storm intensity on March 1 and then turned to the southwest. It dissipated later on the same day 300 miles (480 km) east of Mindanao.

=== Tropical Storm Sally ===
- Tropical storm (JMA)
- Tropical storm (SSHWS)
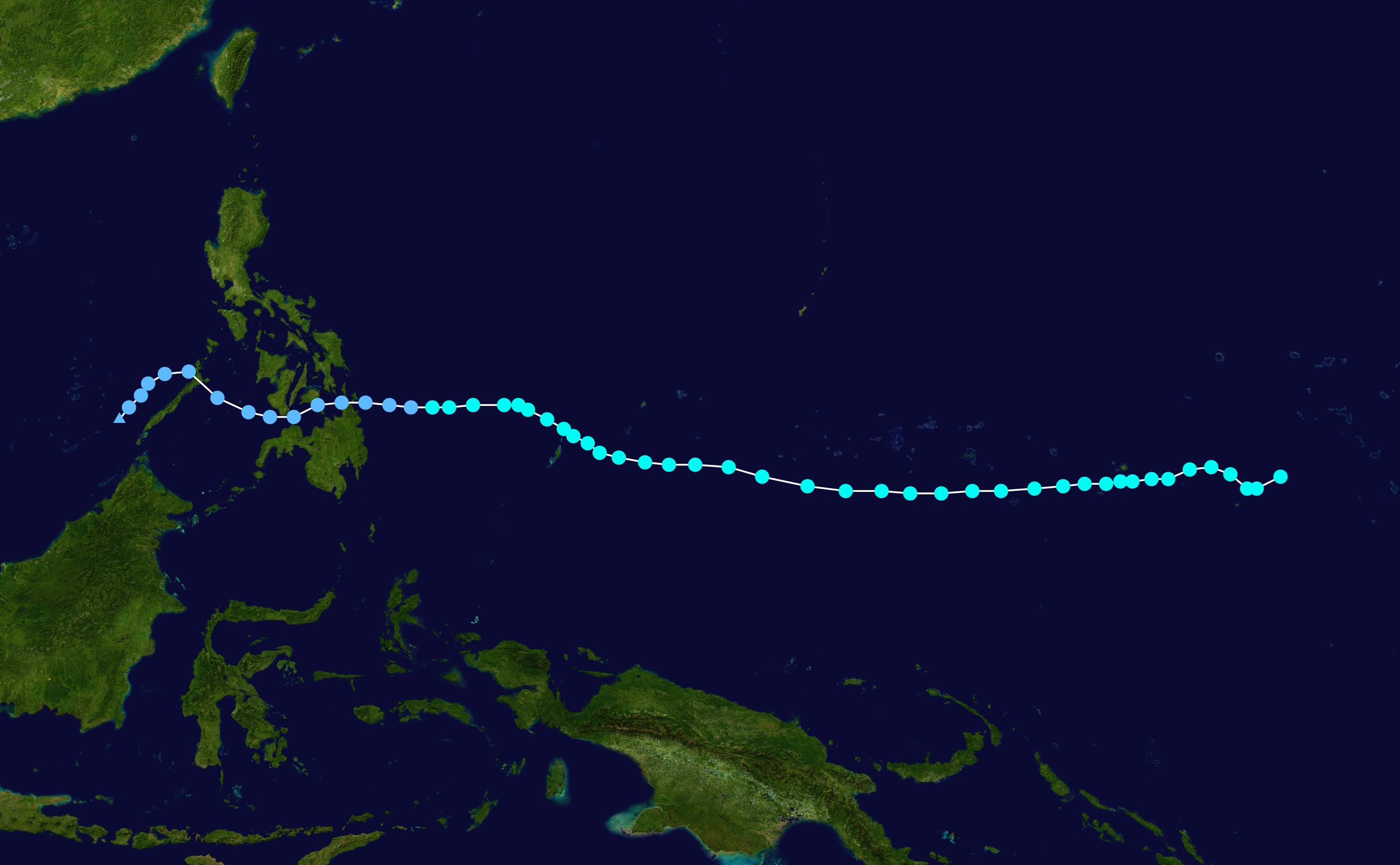
- Duration: March 4 – March 13
- Peak intensity: 100 km/h (65 mph) (1-min); 990 hPa (mbar)

Three days after Ruby dissipated, the second tropical cyclone of the season was detected 200 miles (320 km) southeast of Majuro in the Marshall Islands with winds of 65 miles per hour (105 km/h) After drifting northwest, Sally moved to the southwest on March 5 and then began to move westward, with its winds fluctuating to 50 miles per hour (80 km/h). Sally soon restrengthened on March 6, reaching a secondary peak of 60 miles per hour (97 km/h), and maintained its intensity for 18 hours as it moved steadily westward. After weakening on March 8, Sally briefly jogged to the west-northwest on March 9, and it began to re-intensify as it turned back to the west, quickly reaching its third peak of 60 miles per hour (97 km/h) on March 10. Sally slowly weakened as it turned to the northwest and slowed in forward speed, with its winds decreasing to 45 miles per hour (72 km/h) on March 11. After briefly restrengthening to 60 miles per hour (97 km/h) on March 12, Sally turned to the west and quickly weakened to a tropical depression. The depression briefly turned to the west-southwest and dissipated on March 13 300 miles (480 km) east of Mindanao.

=== Typhoon Tilda ===
- Typhoon (JMA)
- Category 4-equivalent typhoon (SSHWS)
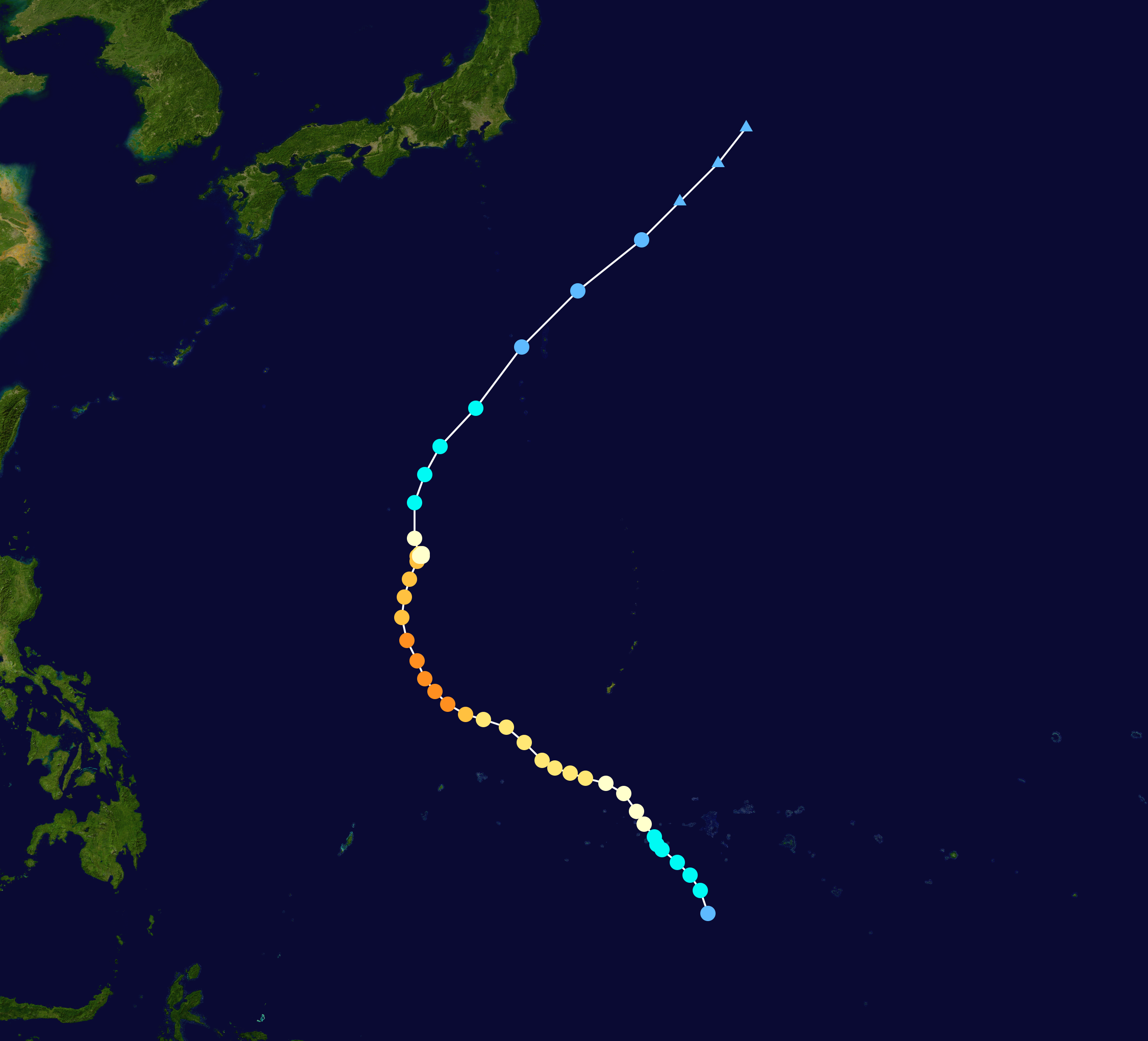
- Duration: April 14 – April 23
- Peak intensity: 230 km/h (145 mph) (1-min); 930 hPa (mbar)

The first typhoon of the season, Tilda originated from a closed circulation on the Intertropical Convergence Zone (ITCZ) south of Truk on April 12. Surface weather analysis determined that the center slowly moved westward, with surface reports indicating intensification. On April 14 a reconnaissance aircraft mission estimated winds of tropical storm force, assigning the storm its name. Whilst slowly steering northwestward on April 15, Tilda intensified into a typhoon after its northeast quadrant had sustained typhoon strength winds. Tilda then moved generally to the northwest with minor fluctuations on April 16 and on the following day, before turning northward on April 18, when it rapidly intensified.

Tilda attained its peak intensity of 145 mph (233 km/h) 400 miles (640 km) west of Guam on April 19, and it slowly weakened as it turned north-northeast and decreased in forward speed. The typhoon became quasi-stationary for 30 hours on April 20, weakening to a minimal typhoon in the process by the next day. After drifting under weak steering currents, Tilda accelerated to the north-northeast on April 22 and weakened to a tropical storm. Tilda dissipated on April 23 as it merged with the upper-level westerlies 130 miles (210 km) southwest of Iwo Jima, and overall stayed in the open ocean, causing no casualties.

=== Tropical Depression Violet ===
- Tropical depression (JMA)
- Tropical depression (SSHWS)
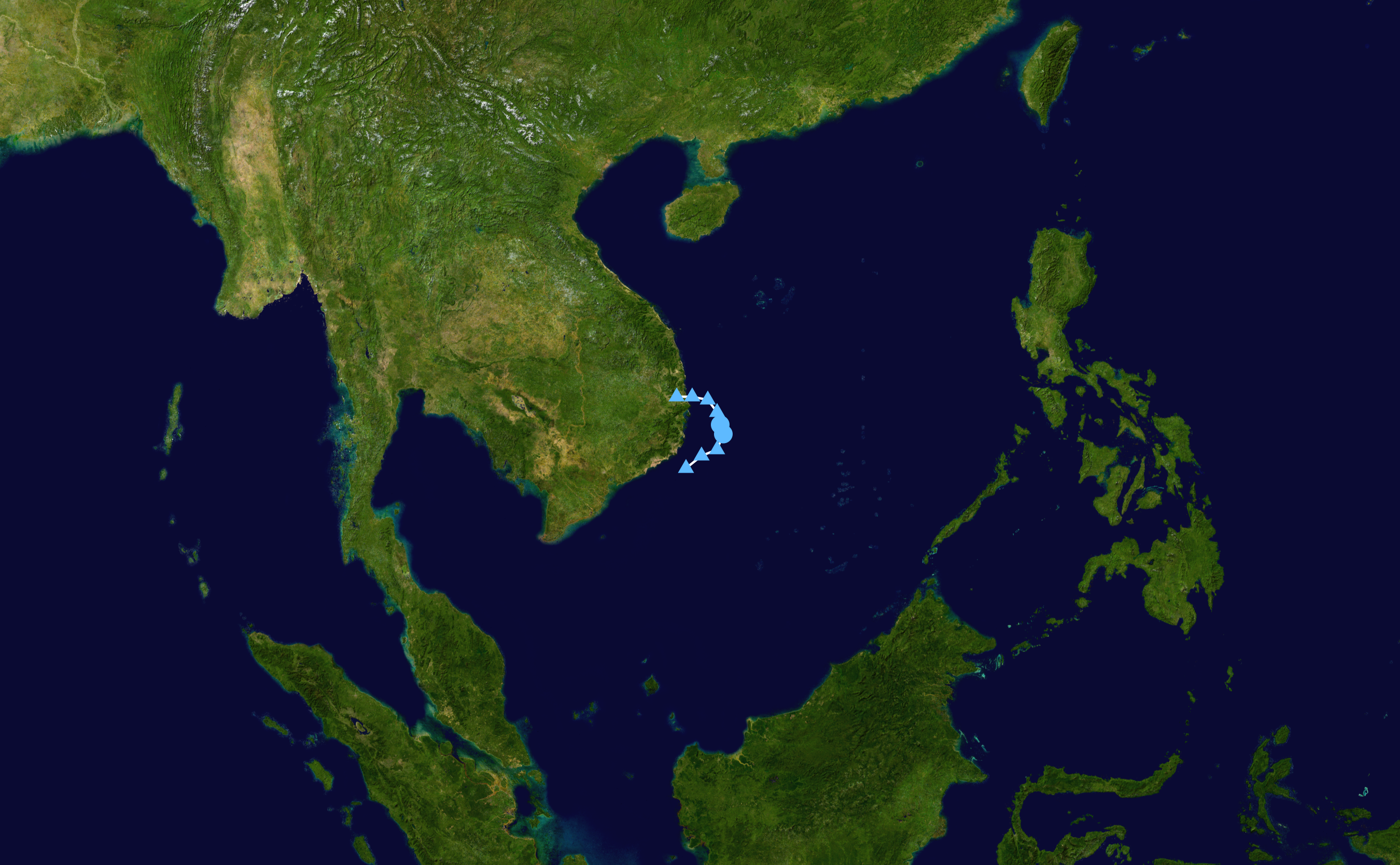
- Duration: June 27 – June 29
- Peak intensity: 45 km/h (30 mph) (1-min); 1001 hPa (mbar)

Being the first tropical depression monitored by the Joint Typhoon Warning Center (JTWC), Violet formed offshore Vietnam on June 27. The depression moved eastward at a speed of 6 knots (11 km/h; 6.9 mph), before recurving westward the following day. The system remained weak, and by June 29, Violet dissipated inland.

=== Tropical Storm Wilda ===
- Tropical storm (JMA)
- Tropical storm (SSHWS)
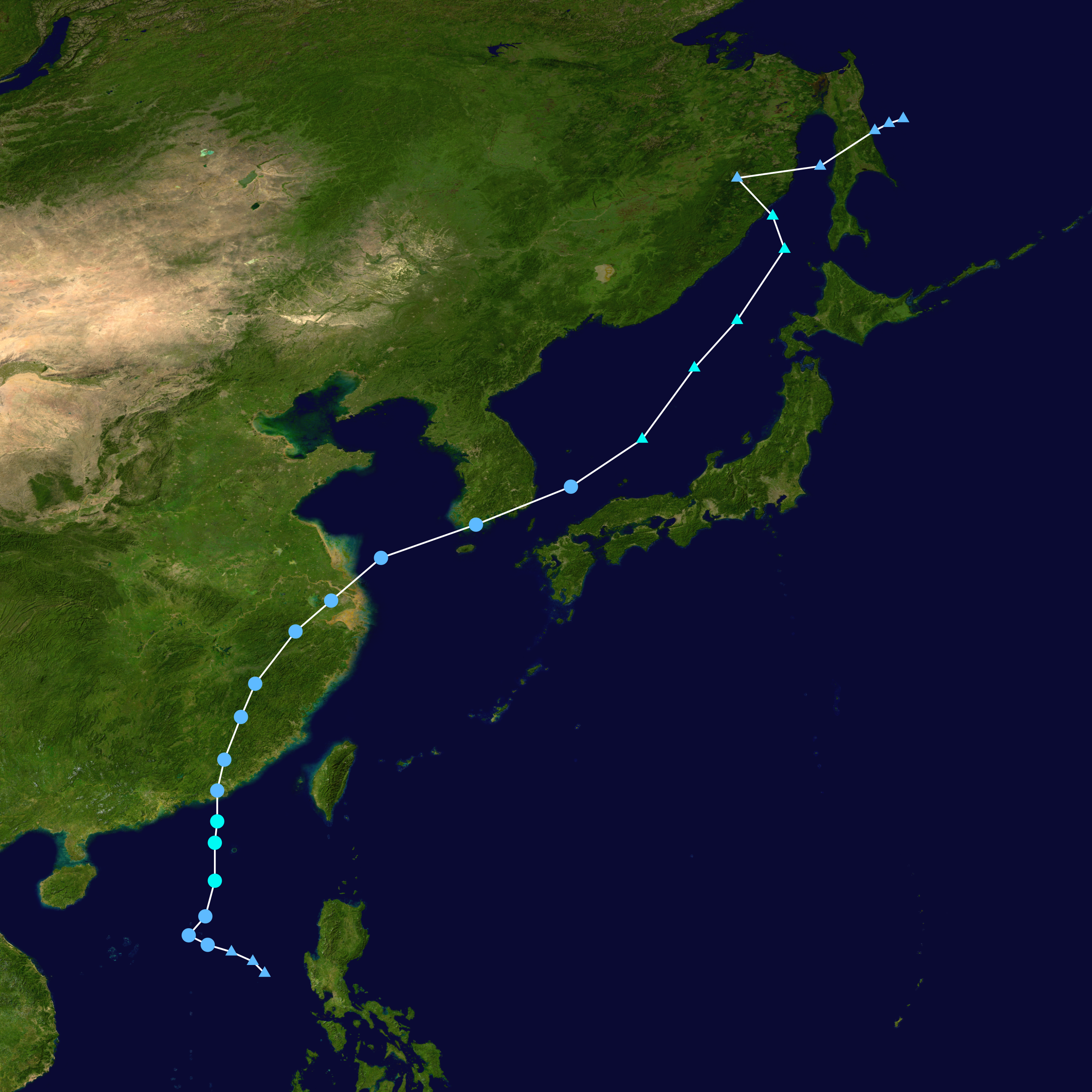
- Duration: July 4 – July 8
- Peak intensity: 65 km/h (40 mph) (1-min); 1000 hPa (mbar)

A tropical depression formed on July 4 in the South China Sea 480 miles (770 km) west of Luzon. After briefly drifting northeast, the depression moved erratically northward on July 5, and it made landfall on mainland China east of Hong Kong on July 6. The system steered northeastward the following day while inland, before entering the East China Sea as an extratropical cyclone on July 8. Wilda made another landfall south of the Korean peninsula on the next day. The system then entered the Korea Strait and curved slightly northward. Wilda made two more landfalls at the Russian Far East, before dissipating on July 10.

Operationally the system was classified as a different tropical storm under the name Wilda, but post-analysis determined that tropical cyclone never attained winds of 39 mph (63 km/h) or greater. No reconnaissance aircraft investigated the system, which was one of only three disturbances not monitored during the season.

=== Tropical Depression Anita ===
- Tropical depression (JMA)
- Tropical depression (SSHWS)
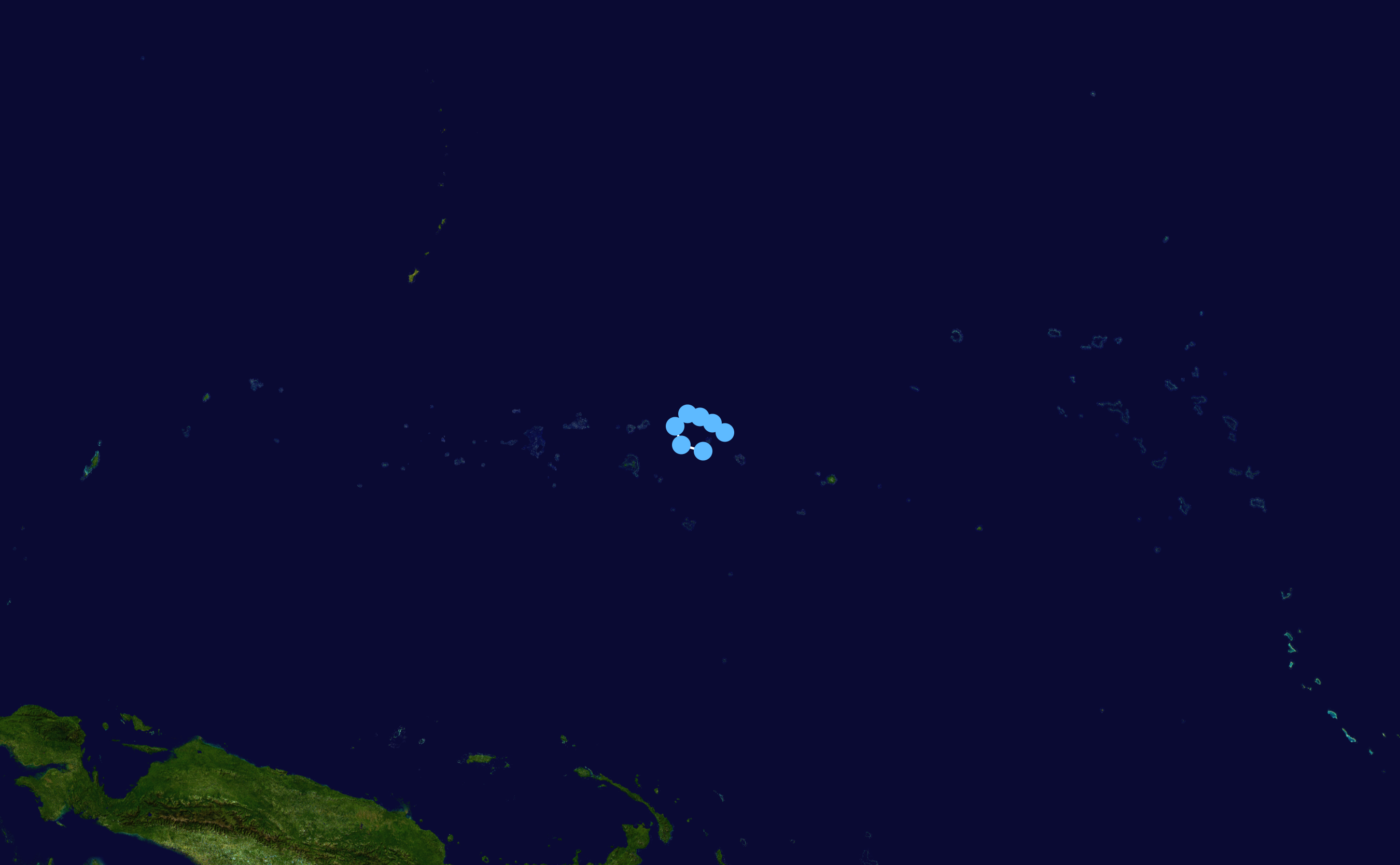
- Duration: July 5 – July 6
- Peak intensity: 55 km/h (35 mph) (1-min);

Tropical Depression Anita was first observed on the vicinity of the Federated States of Micronesia on July 5. The system moved west before recurving east on July 6, and dissipated on that same day.

=== Typhoon Billie ===
- Typhoon (JMA)
- Category 2-equivalent typhoon (SSHWS)
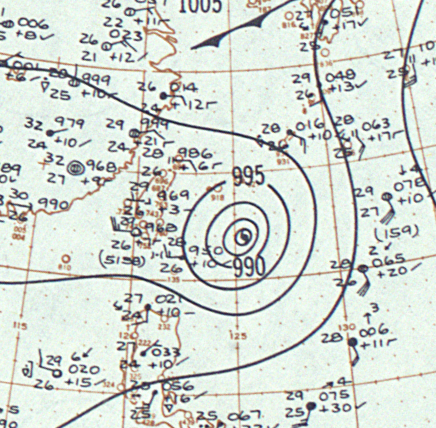
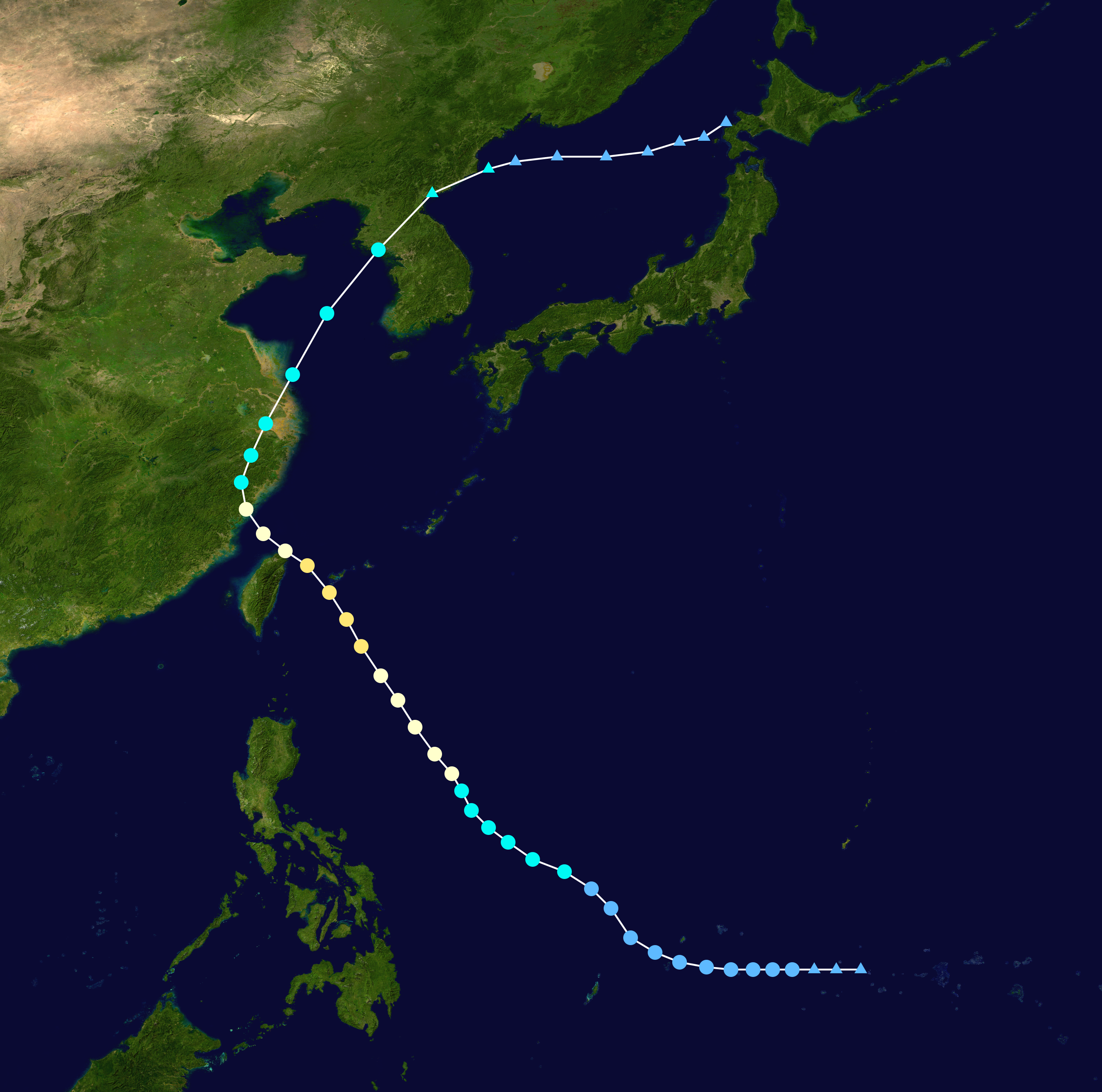
- Duration: July 12 – July 18
- Peak intensity: 165 km/h (105 mph) (1-min); 970 hPa (mbar)

An area of disturbed weather between Yap and Koror organized into a tropical depression on July 12. Moving to the northwest, it quickly strengthened, reaching tropical storm status, after an eye was found by a recon aircraft. On July 13, Billie intensified into a typhoon, before gradually strengthening further. After peaking at 105 mph (169 km/h) that day, Billie crossed over northeastern Taiwan, quickly weakened, and made landfall on eastern China on July 15. A weak trough brought the storm northeastward, where after weakening to a tropical storm, it traversed the Yellow Sea and crossed the Korean Peninsula, losing tropical characteristics on July 18.

Typhoon Billie caused extreme flooding in northeastern Taiwan, causing $500,000 in property damage, leaving 10,000 homeless in the capital city of Taipei, and killing 1. In Japan, the outer edges of the typhoon caused torrential rains, killing 44 and destroying more than 65,000 houses. Storms accompanying Billie and its remnants brought heavy rains and strong winds to South Korea, knocking out police telephone lines in Busan. The sudden onslaught of these storms caused a stampede of roughly 70,000 people out of a stadium, resulting in the indirect deaths of 68 people. Around 125 people were injured and 40 were hospitalized after the mass evacuation.

=== Typhoon Ellen ===
- Typhoon (JMA)
- Category 3 typhoon (SSHWS)
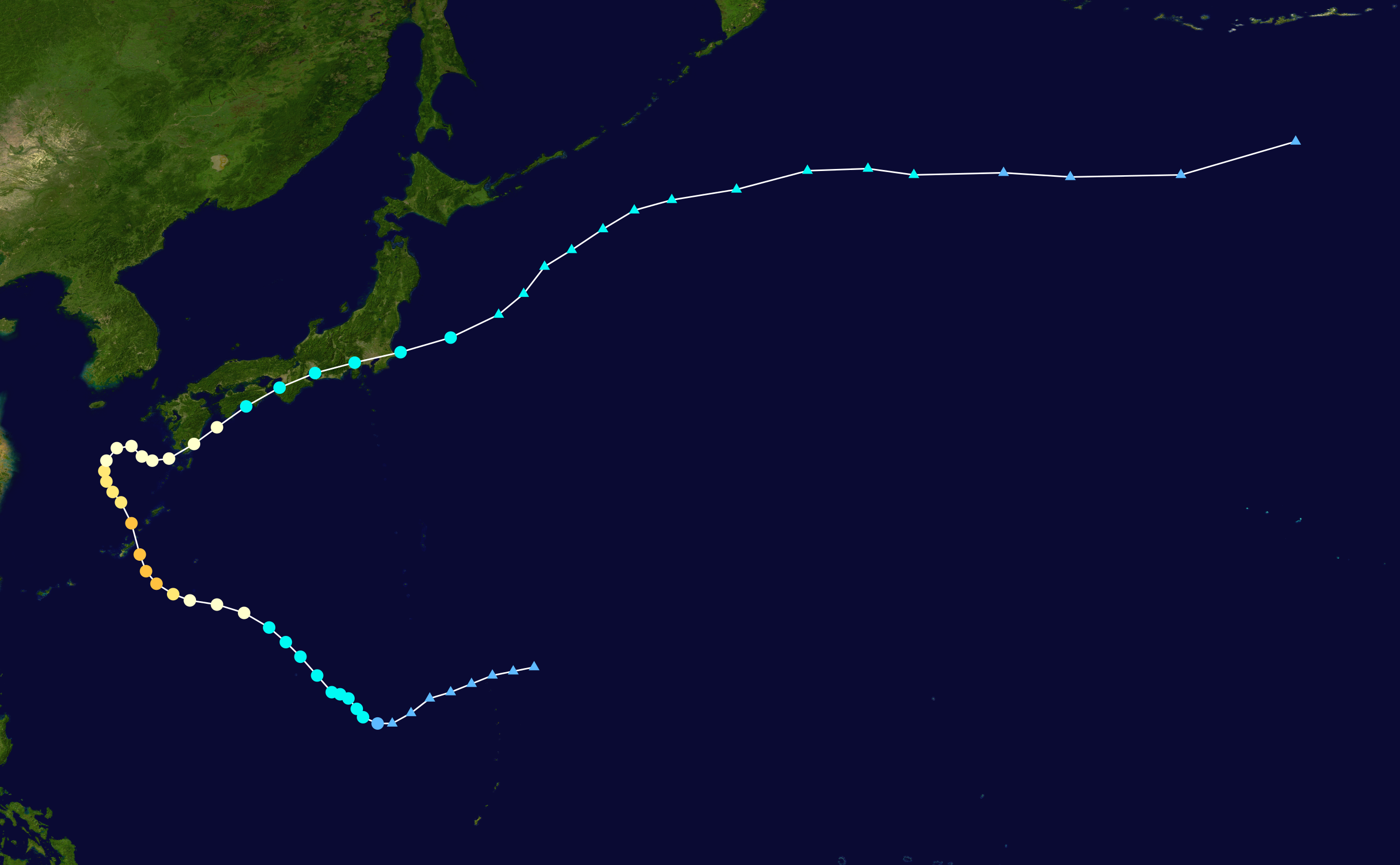
- Duration: August 2 – August 12
- Peak intensity: 185 km/h (115 mph) (1-min); 965 hPa (mbar)

On August 1, a well-developed low pressure area and easterly wave accompanying the area was detected northwest of Guam. Following the discovery of an eye in the system, the area was designated as Tropical Depression Ellen by the JTWC at 06:00 UTC of August 2. Ellen intensified into a tropical storm four hours later, before consolidating further into a typhoon 24 hours after. On August 4, as Ellen moved northwestward, the storm reached its peak intensity while located 320 km (200 mi) south-southeast of Okinawa, attaining winds of 185 km/h (115 mph). Taking an erratic path, Ellen proceeded to decelerate off the coast of Kyushu. A strong ridge to the north prevented Ellen from further movement for approximately 46 hours. During that time, a recon aircraft measured the very large eye at 160 km (100 mi). The ridge then weakened, allowing the typhoon to accelerate in an east-northeast direction. By August 8, Ellen had weakened into a tropical storm. Ellen moved along the south coast of Japan, passing directly above its capital city Tokyo. The storm entered the open sea east of Honshu on August 9, before transitioning into an extratropical cyclone.

Ellen dropped up to 35 inches (890 mm) of rainfall on Japan, killing 11 and causing severe rice crop damage. Ellen's greatest effect, however, was on Taiwan, where torrential rains associated with the typhoon caused disastrous flooding that killed nearly 700, left tens of thousands homeless, and destroyed much of the transportation infrastructure in the central and southwestern part of the island. Some locations received almost 50 inches of rain in three days, exceeding local annual average totals. The heaviest rain event was on August 7, when as much as 25 inches (640 mm) of rain fell in the mountains and western plains, causing rivers and streams to burst through levees and flood thousands of hectares of farmland, washing away rural villages, and causing widespread urban flooding as well in Taichung and other cities. The economic impact was particularly extensive and long-lasting due to the widespread flooding of farmland. In Taiwan the event is remembered as the "Great August 7 Flood".

=== Tropical Depression Fran ===
- Tropical depression (JMA)
- Tropical depression (SSHWS)
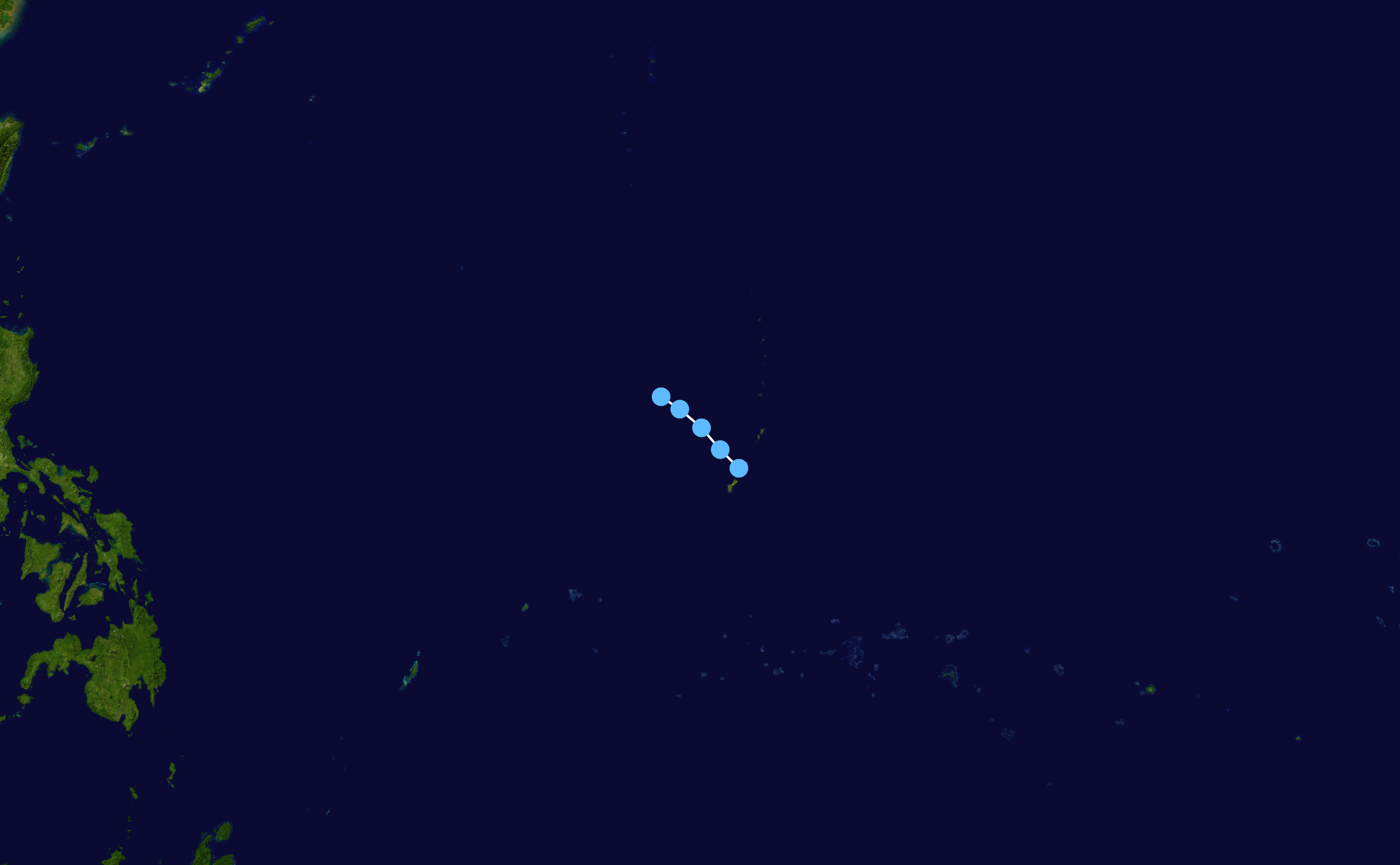
- Duration: August 11 – August 12
- Peak intensity: 55 km/h (35 mph) (1-min);

First observed on August 11, Tropical Depression Fran was located 97 km (60 mi) north of Guam. The depression moved northwest before dissipating on August 12, under the influence of Typhoon Georgia's predominant circulation.

=== Typhoon Georgia ===
- Typhoon (JMA)
- Category 3-equivalent typhoon (SSHWS)
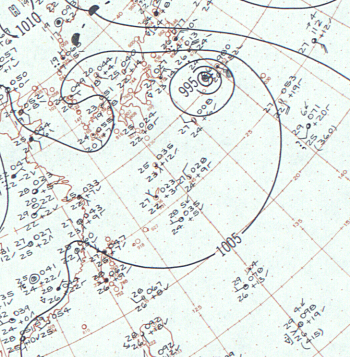
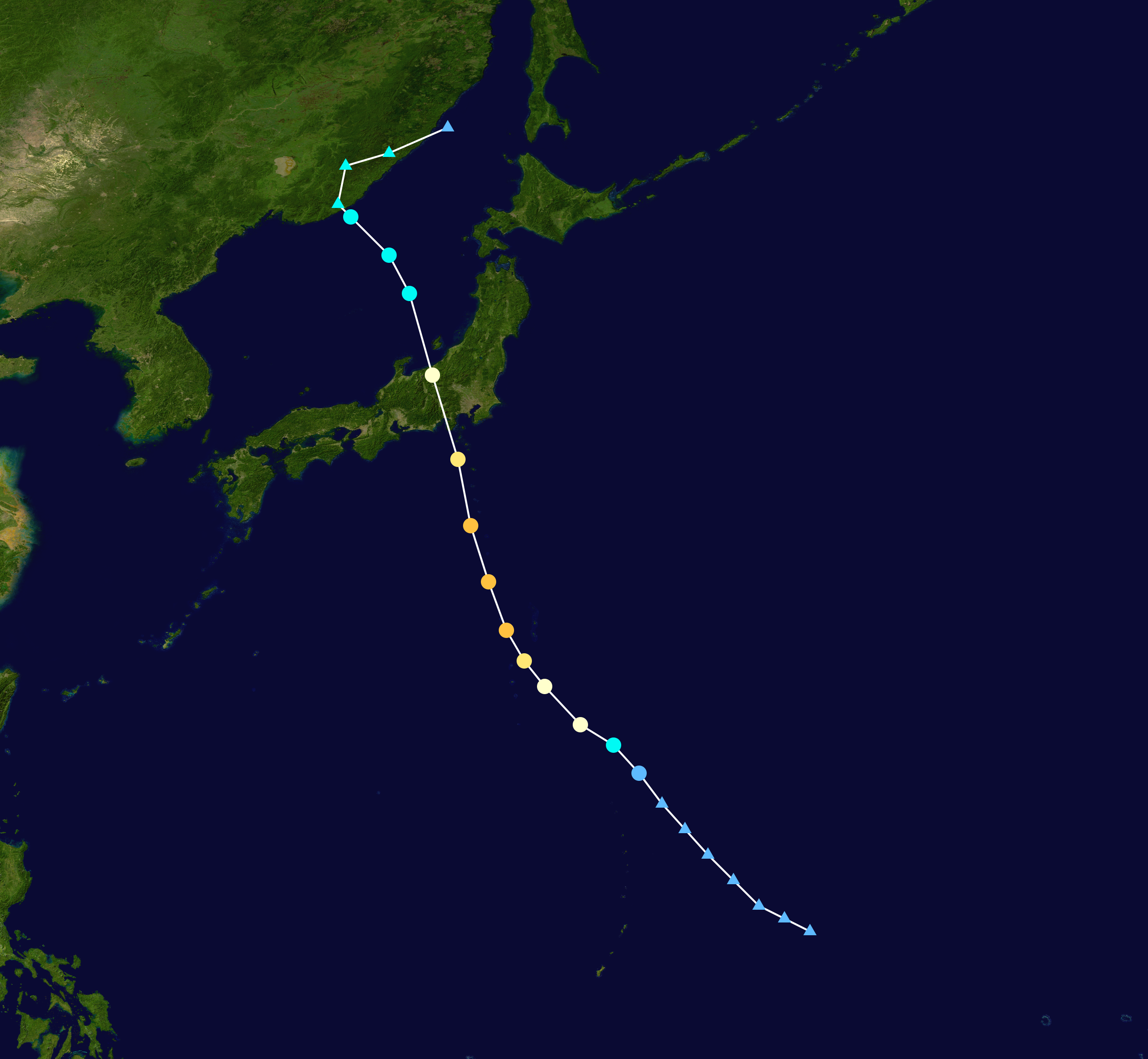
- Duration: August 12 – August 14
- Peak intensity: 205 km/h (125 mph) (1-min); 960 hPa (mbar)

On August 12, Fran was split into two circulation centers by an upper-air polar trough. The new circulation consolidated into a tropical storm on August 13, receiving the name Georgia. Georgia quickly strengthened into a typhoon, and reached its peak intensity of 205 km/h (125 mph) in 06:00 UTC of that same day. The typhoon then proceeded to rapidly accelerate at a speed of 25 km/h (15 mph) for the next 24 hours. After crossing through the Japanese mainland, Georgia weakened into an extratropical cyclone on August 14.

Just 4 days after Ellen hit Japan, Typhoon Georgia hit the southeastern portion of the country. Georgia brought more heavy rains to the country, causing 246 fatalities and leaving over 50,000 homeless. Georgia caused torrential damage to Japan's railroad network, and combined with Typhoon Ellen, produced a damage total of $50 million (1959 USD).

=== Tropical Depression Hope ===
- Tropical depression (JMA)
- Tropical depression (SSHWS)
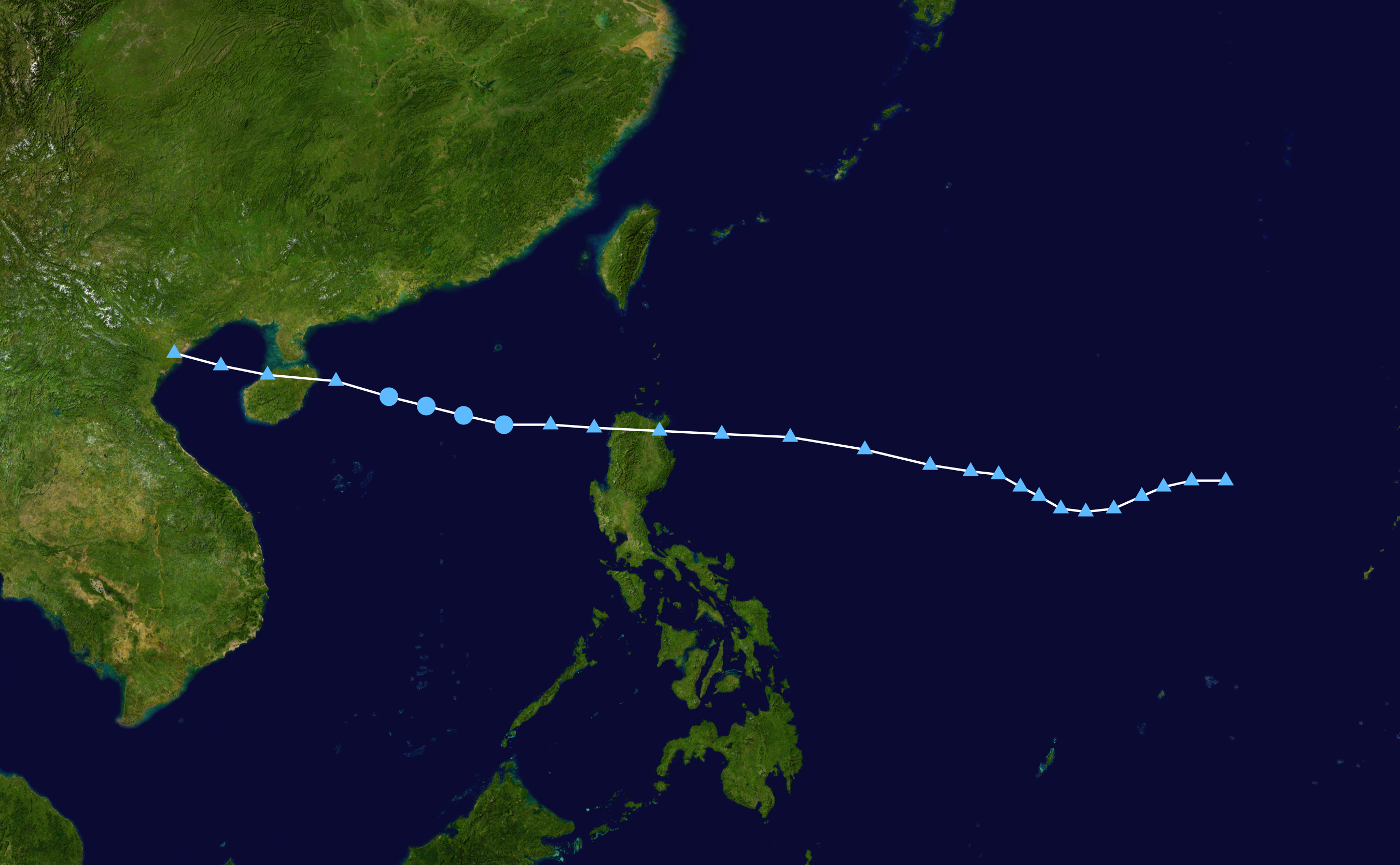
- Duration: August 17 – August 19
- Peak intensity: 55 km/h (35 mph) (1-min); 997 hPa (mbar)

A tropical disturbance in the Philippine Sea was first indicated on August 13, taking a slight dip south on August 15, before generally going in a west direction. The system made its first landfall over Luzon at 12:00 UTC of August 17, before intensifying into a tropical depression that day. The depression continued its journey westward before reaching inland at Hainan on August 19, prior to weakening back into a tropical disturbance. The system entered the Beibu Gulf and made its final landfall over northern Vietnam, and dissipated on August 20.

=== Typhoon Iris ===
- Typhoon (JMA)
- Category 2-equivalent typhoon (SSHWS)
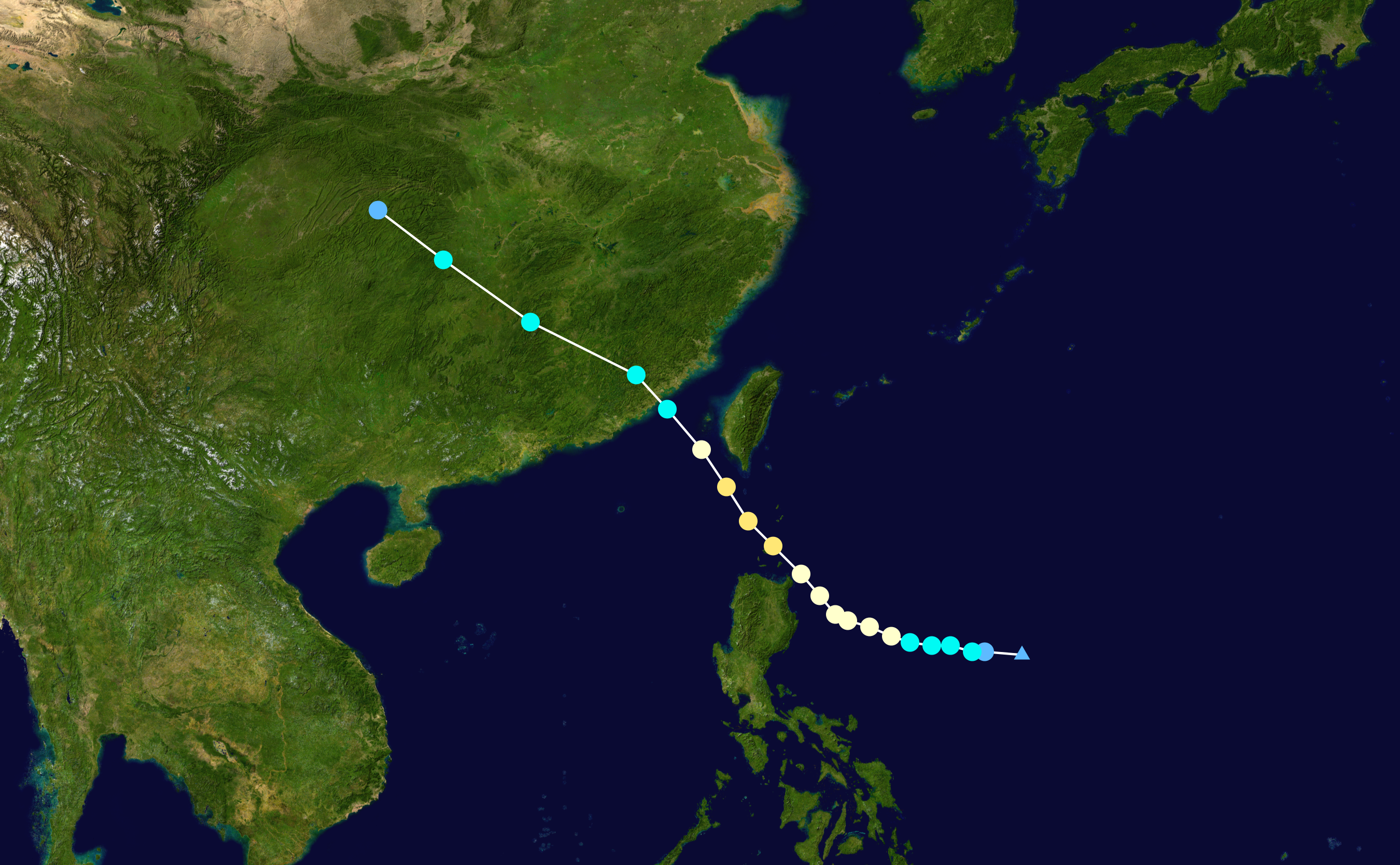
- Duration: August 19 – August 23
- Peak intensity: 165 km/h (105 mph) (1-min); 965 hPa (mbar)

On August 18, a tropical disturbance on the ITCZ was found on a surface chart, possessing a weak circulation. However, later on August 20, a recon aircraft was sent to the center of the system, and recorded typhoon strength winds. Typhoon Iris passed north of Luzon, where it steered west-northwestward, subdued from going more north by a strong high. The high gradually weakened, beginning Iris's recurvature toward the northwest. The typhoon's winds then peaked at 170 km/h (105 mph) on August 22, before they weakened to tropical storm strength. The storm moved over the coast of China near Kao-Chi, where it rapidly became extratropical and dissipated on August 23.

Typhoon Iris caused rough seas off the coast of Luzon, sinking at least two ships and killing 89 people. In China, the storm brought torrential rains, killing 720 people with 996 missing in the Fujian province in southeast China; however, according to the National Oceanic and Atmospheric Administration, the death toll may be as high as 2,334.

=== Typhoon Joan ===
- Typhoon (JMA)
- Category 5-equivalent super typhoon (SSHWS)
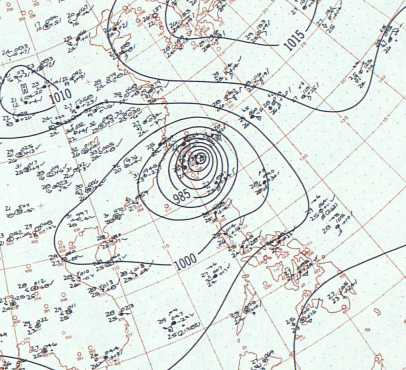
- Duration: August 25 – August 31
- Peak intensity: 315 km/h (195 mph) (1-min); 885 hPa (mbar)

A surface circulation was found northeast of Guam on August 23. The system was classified as a tropical storm at 02:35 UTC of August 25, and quickly strengthened into a typhoon within 23 hours. Moving in a northwest direction, Joan proceeded to rapidly intensify to winds of 315 km/h (195 mph) and deepened to sea-level pressure of 885 hPa (26.13 inHg) on August 29, becoming the 11th most intense tropical cyclone and the most powerful storm of the season. Such winds are dubious, due to the infancy of reconnaissance aircraft at the time and the lack of satellite images. Nevertheless, Joan was a powerful typhoon, and struck eastern Taiwan with estimated winds of 185 mph (298 km/h). The mountainous terrain in Taiwan induced a weakening effect on Joan as the storm's center moved above the island, before passing through mainland China on August 30, before rapidly dissipating inland. During its lifespan, Joan was at one point a huge storm, extending to 1,600 km (1,000 mi) in diameter, with 90 km/h (55 mph) winds spanning up to a radius of 480 km (300 mi).

Strong winds and heavy flooding caused 11 casualties and $3 million in crop damage in Taiwan. Property damage was extensive as well, with 3,308 houses destroyed from the typhoon. In China, 3 people were killed and 57 were injured from Joan. About 50,000 homes were evacuated in Fuzhou as the typhoon nears landfall. There were 60 casualties, including 3 deaths. Rainfall from Joan caused several rivers on the Korean peninsula to overflow their banks, killing 17 people and injuring 21. Another 7,000 people were rendered homeless.

=== Tropical Storm Kate ===
- Tropical storm (JMA)
- Tropical storm (SSHWS)
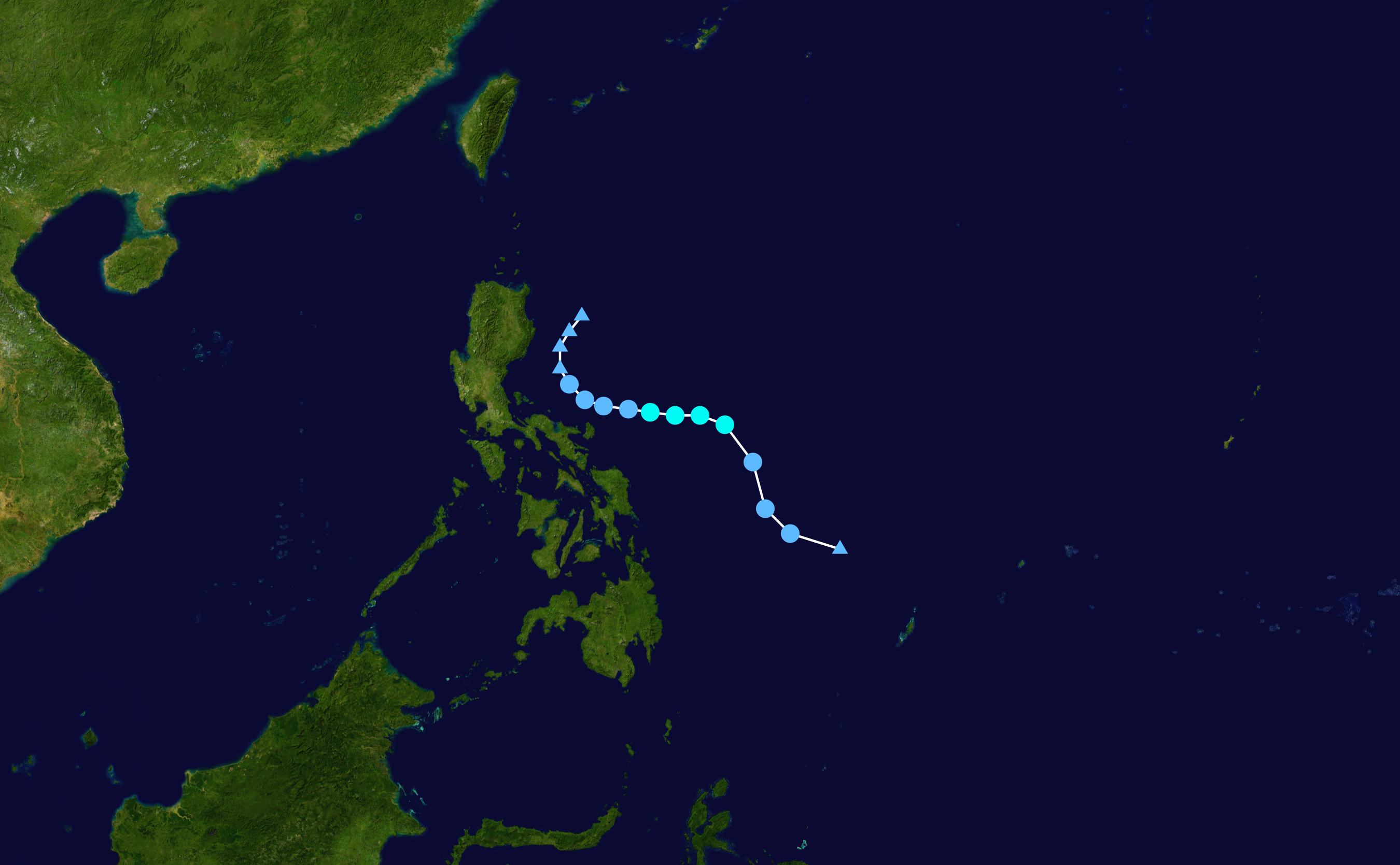
- Duration: August 25 – August 27
- Peak intensity: 75 km/h (45 mph) (1-min); 1000 hPa (mbar)

A tropical depression formed east of the Philippines on August 25, drifting northward before generally moving west. The system peaked as a tropical storm with winds of 75 km/h (45 mph) on the that same day. Kate gradually weakened throughout its lifespan after its peak as it recurved northeastward, degrading to a tropical depression on August 26, before dissipating by August 27.

=== Typhoon Louise ===
- Typhoon (JMA)
- Category 4-equivalent typhoon (SSHWS)
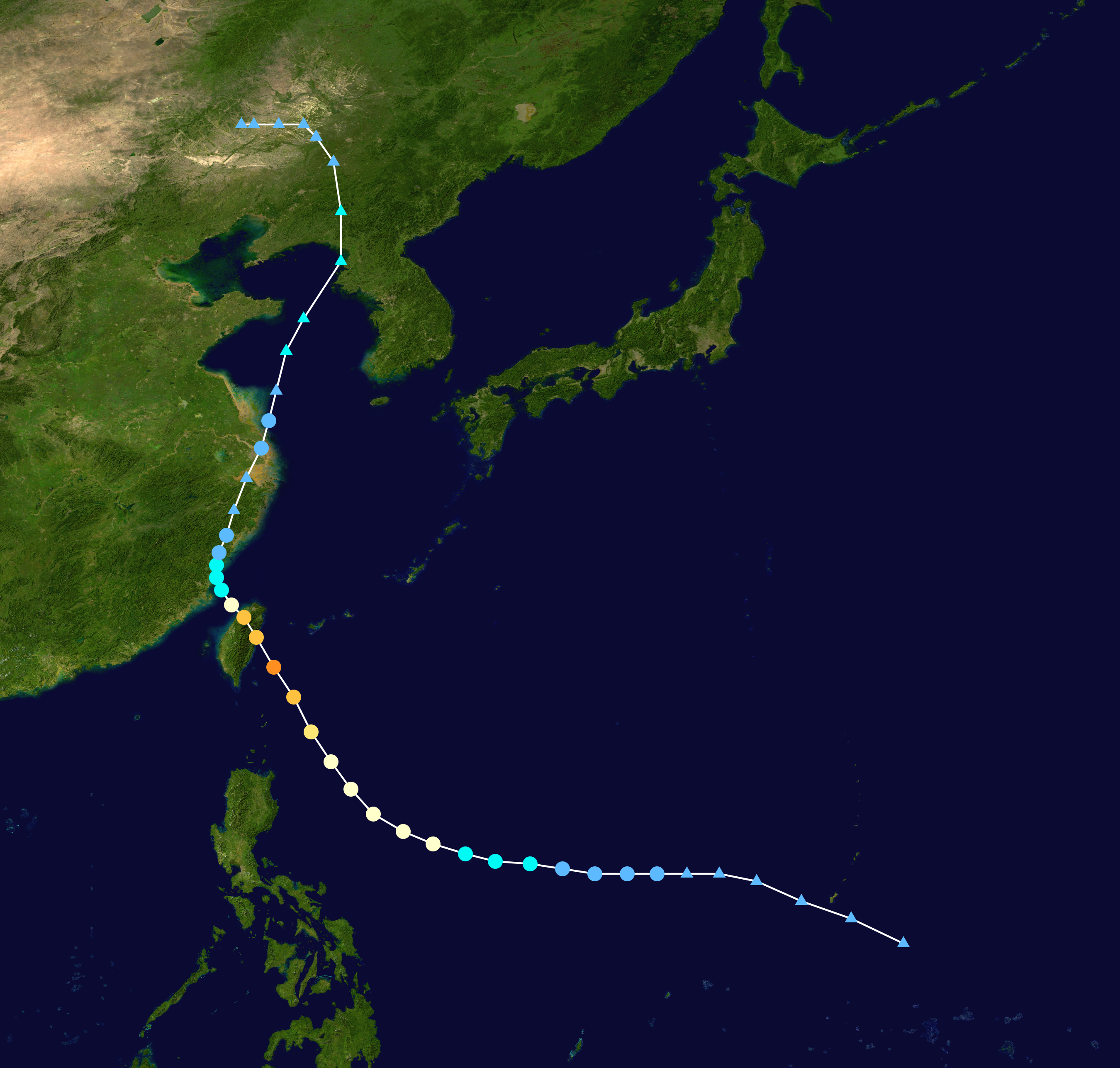
- Duration: August 30 – September 7
- Peak intensity: 220 km/h (140 mph) (1-min); 965 hPa (mbar)

As Typhoon Joan impacted Taiwan, an elongated low-pressure area from the vicinity of Truk formed along the ITCZ on August 27. A recon aircraft was sent on August 30, and concluded the existence of a closed surface circulation, assigning the system as Tropical Depression Louise. Though multiple circulations were present in the same general area, Louise's circulation, being the strongest, drifted to west-northwest of Guam, retaining its name. Moving westerly throughout the next day, Louise intensified into a tropical storm. The storm began to recurve to the north-northwest on September 1, and rapidly intensified into a typhoon on that same day. Louise maintained this recurvature throughout the next day, and by September 3, it had attained peak intensity with winds of 220 km/h (135 mph). Around that time, its eye was measured at 80 km (50 mi).

Typhoon Louise struck Taiwan, where it left 6 people dead, 167 injured, and 6,100 homeless throughout the island. The Hualien County suffered the brunt of it, enduring great force from the storm. The eye then expanded to 160 km (100 mi) upon reaching the Taiwan Strait, though the storm had weakened to 120 km/h (75 mph). The semi-permanent North Pacific High influence the typhoon into a steady north-northwestward course. Further weakening was induced, downgrading Louise to a tropical storm on September 4, before passing above the coast of China. Louise further downgraded to a tropical depression, but was upgraded to tropical storm strength after reaching the Yellow Sea. As Louise moved farther north, it weakened back to a tropical depression on September 7, before transitioning into an extratropical low, and become embedded with the polar front.

=== Tropical Depression Marge ===
- Tropical depression (JMA)
- Tropical depression (SSHWS)
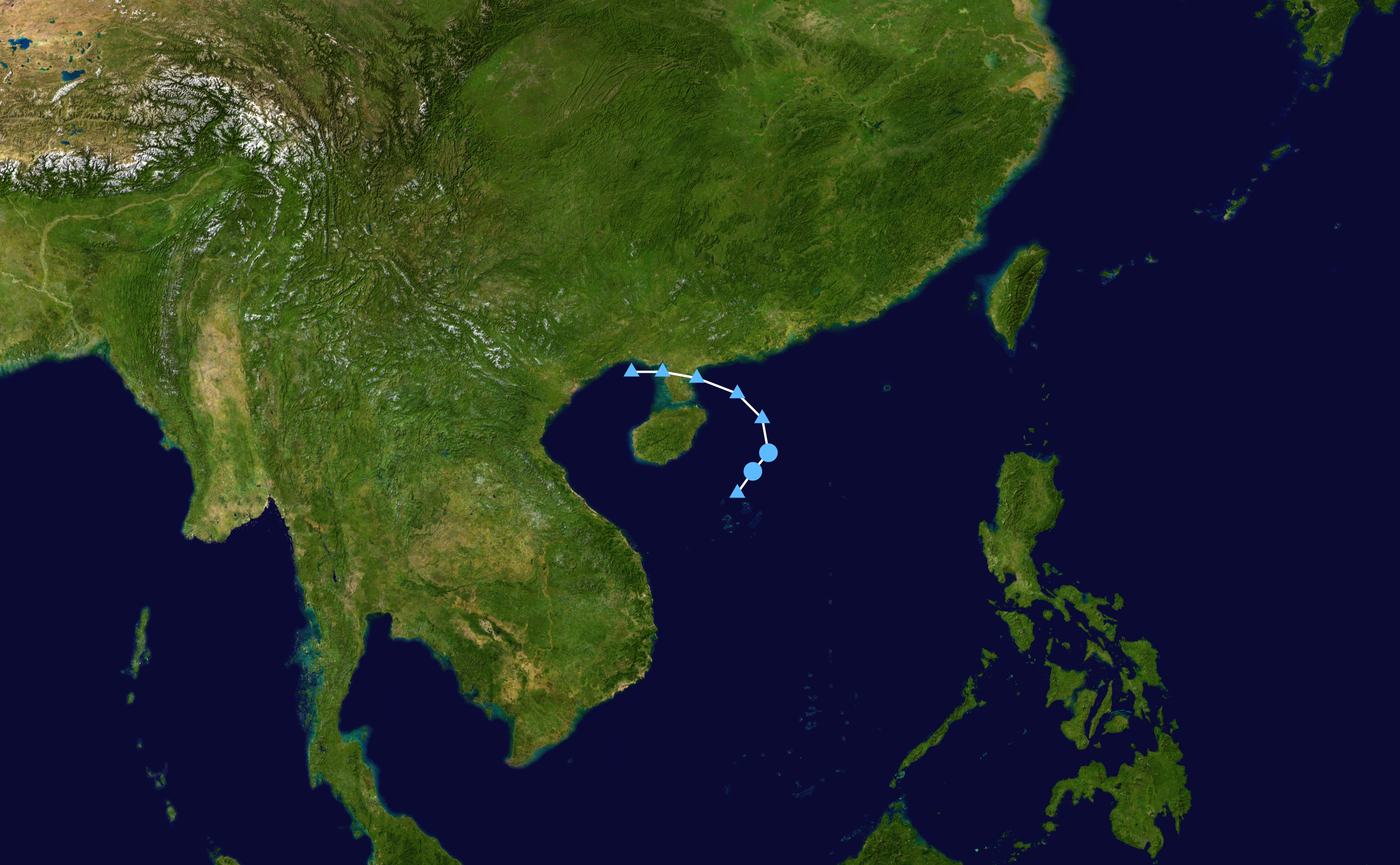
- Duration: September 2 – September 3
- Peak intensity: 45 km/h (30 mph) (1-min); 1000 hPa (mbar)

A weak system, Tropical Depression Marge was first observed on September 1, before its winds was assessed by the next day. The depression moved in a north-northeast direction before recurving westward on September 3, striking Zhanjiang on that day also, before dissipating by 12:00 UTC.

=== Tropical Storm Nora ===
- Tropical storm (JMA)
- Tropical storm (SSHWS)
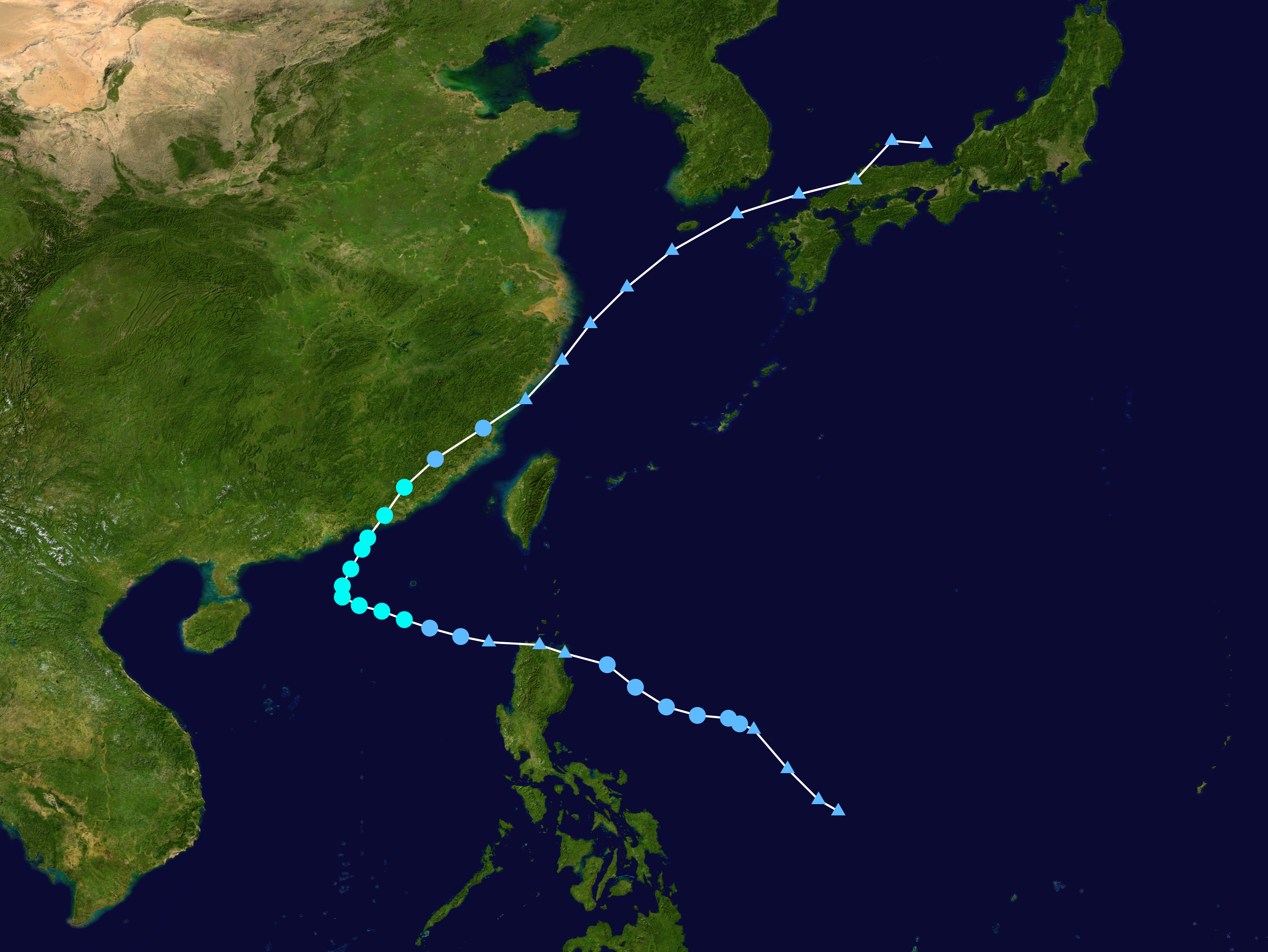
- Duration: September 5 – September 12
- Peak intensity: 95 km/h (60 mph) (1-min); 990 hPa (mbar)

Nora formed along the ITCZ on September 5. The system traversed west-northwestward and passed above the northern side of Luzon on September 7. Two days later, Nora intensified into a tropical storm and peaked with winds of 95 km/h (60 mph). Whilst in the South China Sea on September 10, Tropical Storm Nora took a turn in a northeast direction, before reaching the Chinese coast the following day. Nora weakened into a tropical depression, and entered the East China Sea on September 12. The storm continued northeast until it dissipated on the same day near the Oki Islands.

=== Tropical Storm Opal ===
- Tropical depression (JMA)
- Tropical storm (SSHWS)
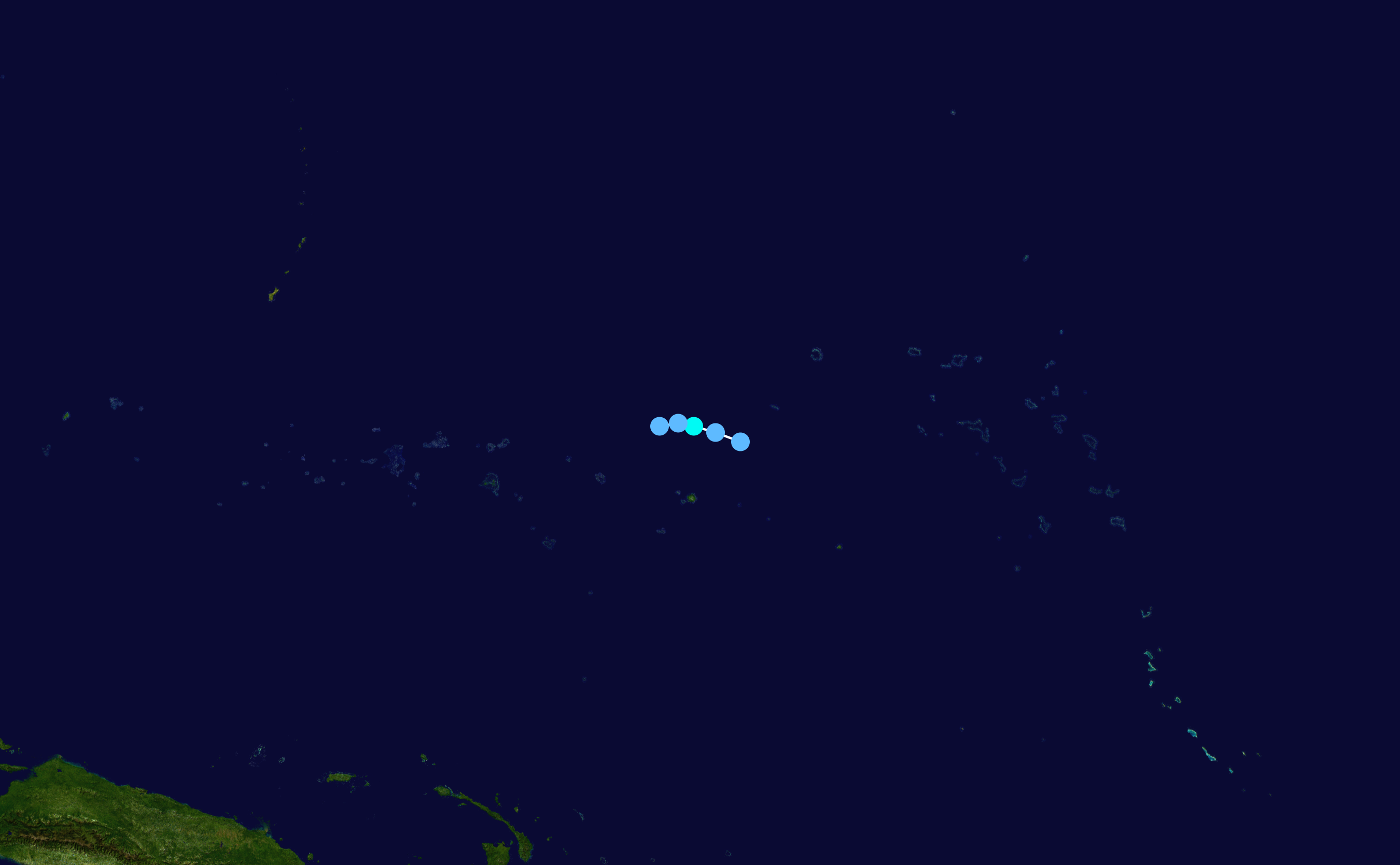
- Duration: September 5 – September 6
- Peak intensity: 65 km/h (40 mph) (1-min);

Tropical Storm Opal was short-lived, forming between northeast of Pohnpei and southwest of Ujelang Atoll on September 5, moving west-northwestward before dissipating the next day.

=== Typhoon Patsy ===
- Typhoon (JMA)
- Category 4-equivalent typhoon (SSHWS)
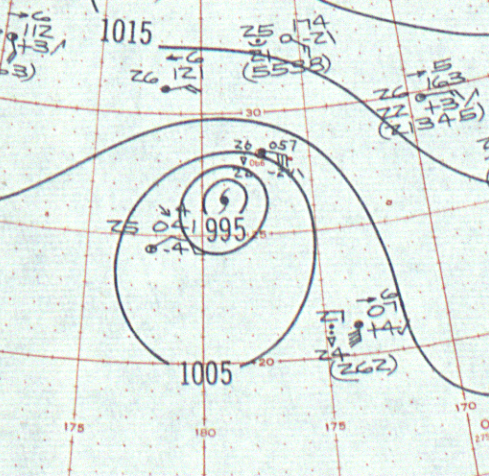
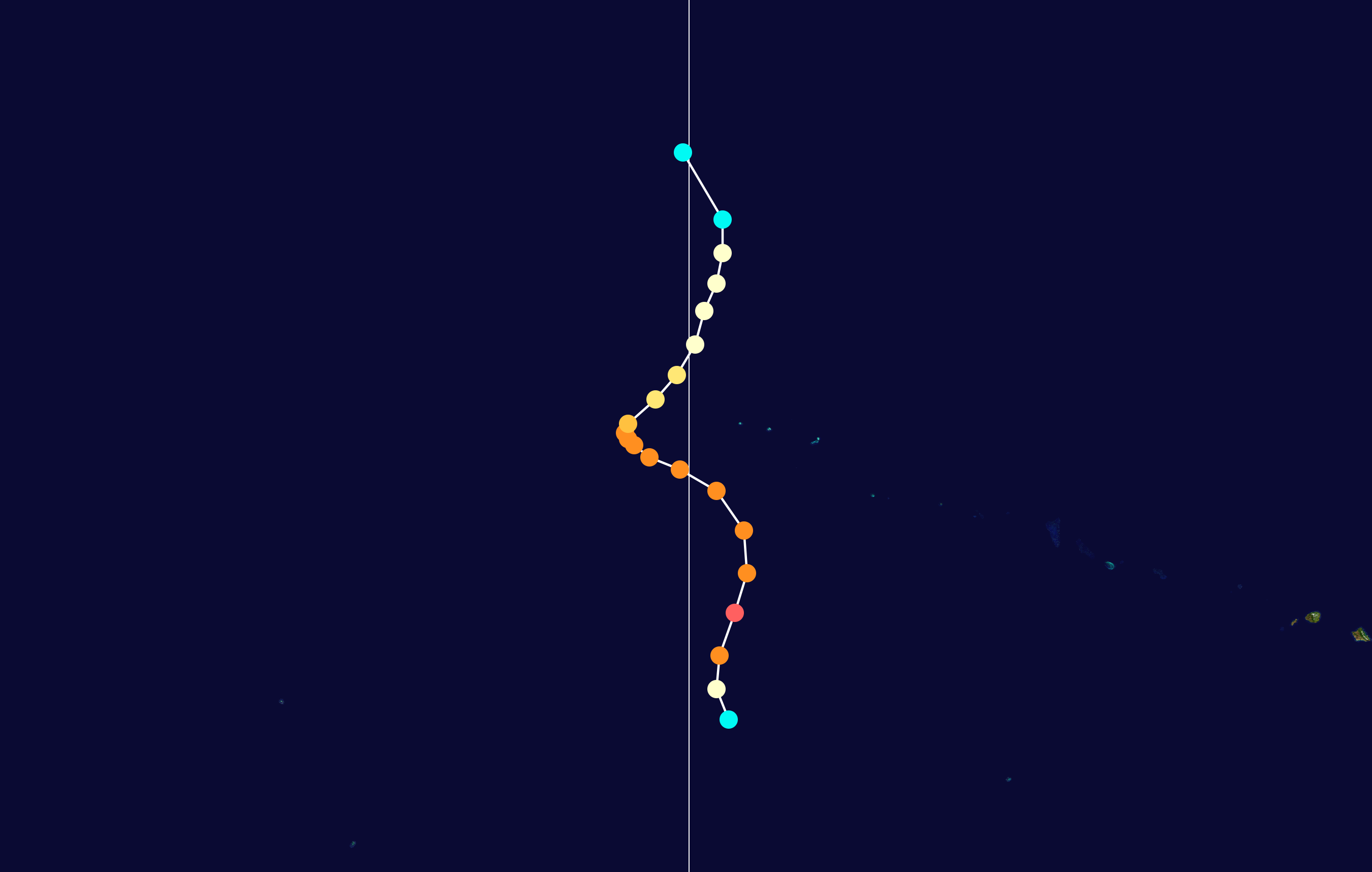
- Duration: September 6 – September 10
- Peak intensity: 220 km/h (140 mph) (1-min); 965 hPa (mbar)

On September 6, reports from aircraft indicated the existence of a tropical storm near the International Date Line. Earlier stages were missed because of a lack of data in the isolated area. A trough moved Patsy northeast. A second trough then developed, dominated over the first, and recurved Patsy northeast. It then slowly headed northwards and gradually weakened. It dissipated on September 10. Patsy's erratic path near the dateline was unusual and no known tropical cyclone had taken such a path over the previous ten years, although that of Typhoon June 1958 was somewhat similar.

The Japan Meteorological Agency's "best track" does not give windspeeds, only indicating that Patsy was a typhoon. The Joint Typhoon Warning Center's report disagrees on location but also has Patsy's maximum windspeed east of the dateline; the JMA's data does not indicate windspeeds. Patsy is an uncommon west-to-east crosser of the dateline. Including only systems recognized by the Central Pacific Hurricane Center, that has only happened six times since.

=== Tropical Depression Ruth ===
- Tropical depression (JMA)
- Tropical depression (SSHWS)
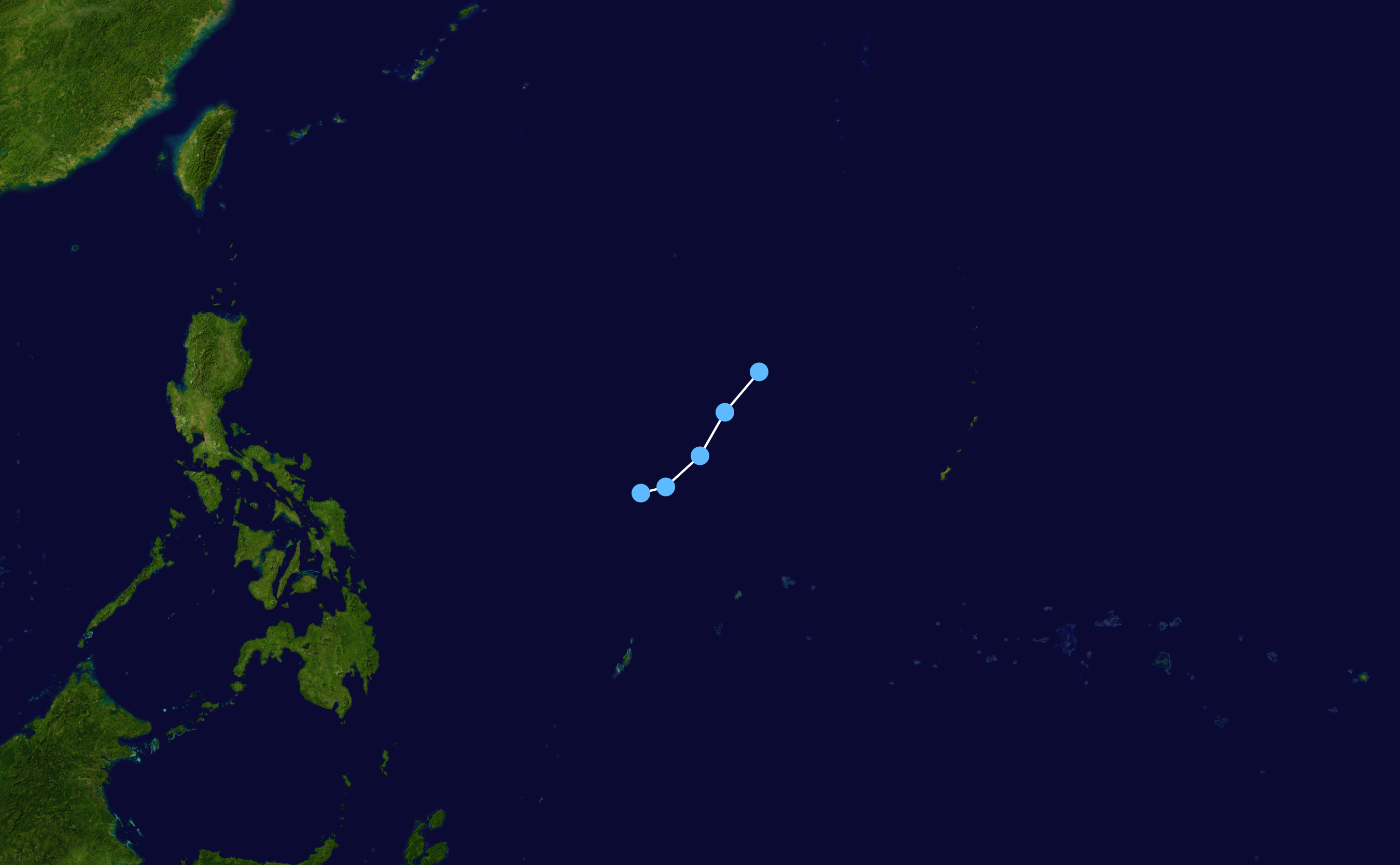
- Duration: September 8 – September 10
- Peak intensity: 55 km/h (35 mph) (1-min);

Forming on September 8 along the ITCZ, Ruth moved southwest midway between Guam and the Philippines. By 12:00 UTC of September 10, Ruth had dissipated.

=== Typhoon Sarah ===
- Typhoon (JMA)
- Category 5-equivalent super typhoon (SSHWS)
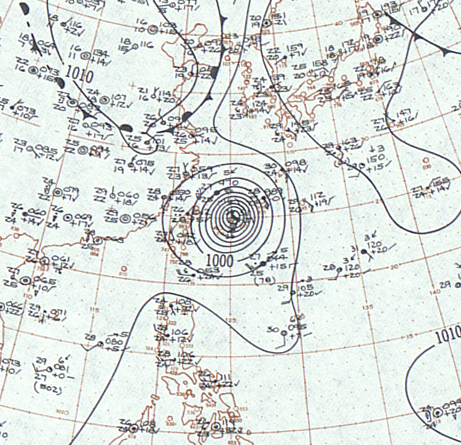
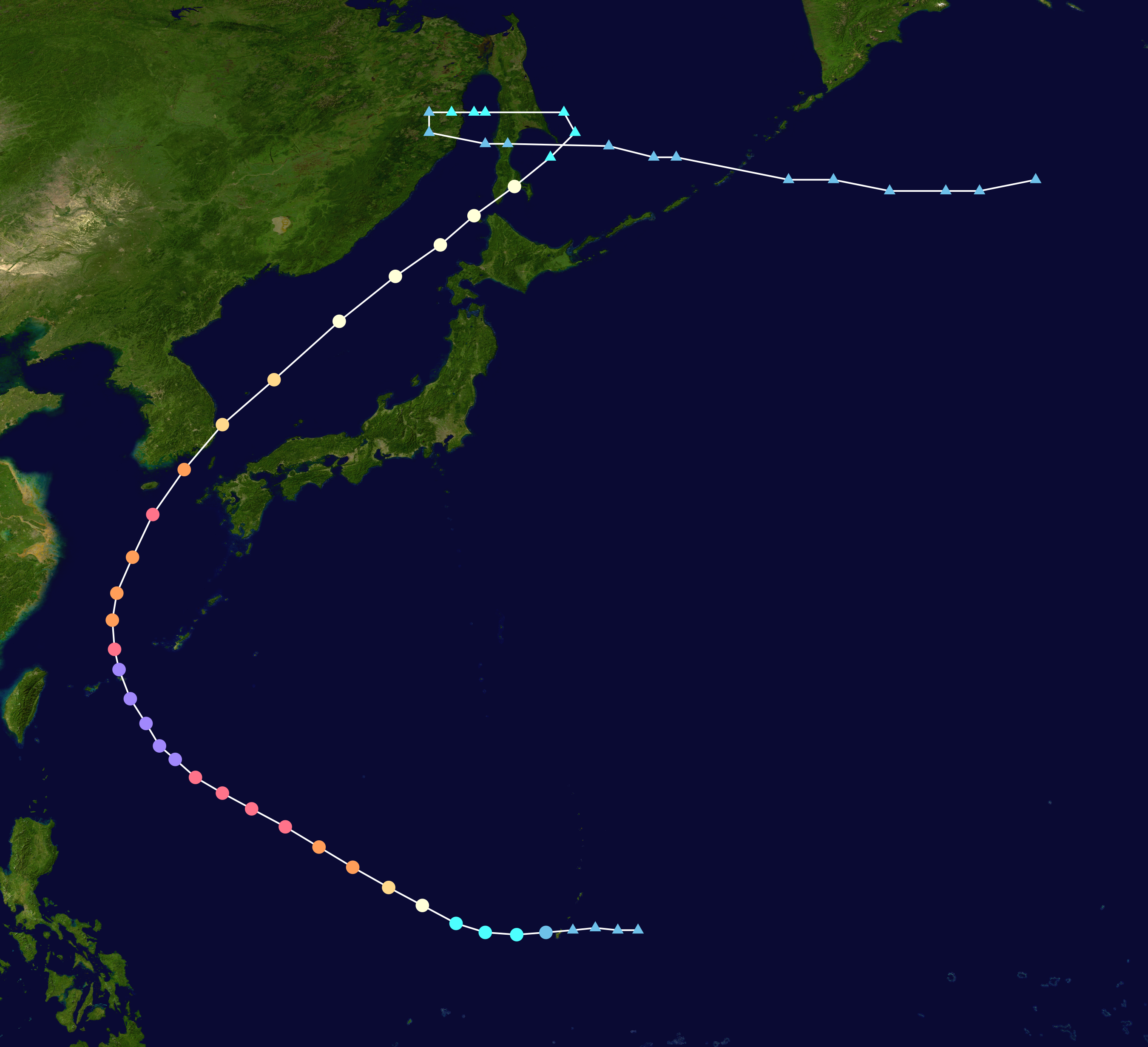
- Duration: September 11 – September 19
- Peak intensity: 305 km/h (190 mph) (1-min); 895 hPa (mbar)

A tropical disturbance north of Ponape formed along the ITCZ on September 10. Based on data gathered by a reconnaissance aircraft, it intensified into a tropical depression on September 11. Sarah passed north of Guam, giving the island light wind gusts and some showers. After the circulation had been well-defined, it was upgraded to a tropical storm at 12:00 UTC. About 12 hours later, it further strengthened into a typhoon. On September 14, rapid intensification ensued, and Sarah attained maximum sustained winds of 305 km/h (190 mph). Following a parabolic path, Sarah passed above the island of Miyako-jima, where winds of 196 km/h (122 mph) were recorded. Sarah struck the southeastern tip of the Korean peninsula and accelerated and weakened afterward. By September 16, Sarah had become extratropical.

On Miyako-jima, Sarah's high winds and rain caused 7 deaths and destroyed 6,000 houses, causing $2 million in crop damage. In all of Korea, extreme flooding and storm surge killed 669 people and left 782,126 homeless one day before Chuseok, which is one of the Korea's biggest holidays. Extreme crop damage and property damage amounted to $100 million (1959 USD) ($638 million 2005 USD). Flooding in Japan killed 24, with thousands of houses either destroyed or damaged.

=== Tropical Depression Thelma ===
- Tropical depression (JMA)
- Tropical depression (SSHWS)
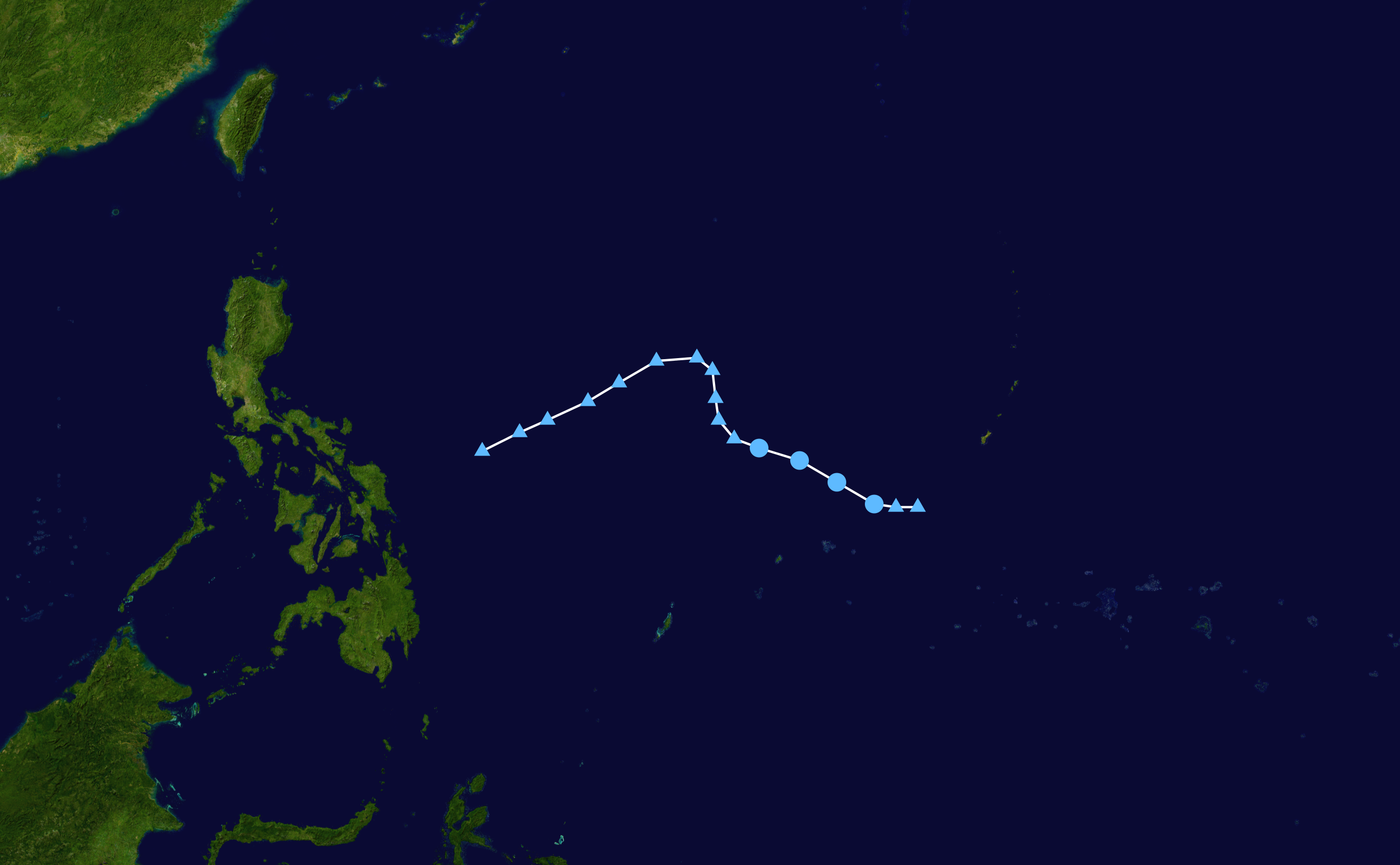
- Duration: September 18 – September 19
- Peak intensity: 55 km/h (35 mph) (1-min);

On September 18, the China Meteorological Administration assessed that a tropical disturbance formed northeast of Ulithi Atoll. It moved in a west-northwest direction before becoming classified as a tropical depression at 18:00 UTC. Thelma however weakened back into a disturbance 24 hours later on September 19. On the following day, Thelma recurved more northward, before steering west then southwest on September 21. The disturbance later dissipated on September 22 at 06:00 UTC.

=== Typhoon Vera ===
- Typhoon (JMA)
- Category 5-equivalent super typhoon (SSHWS)
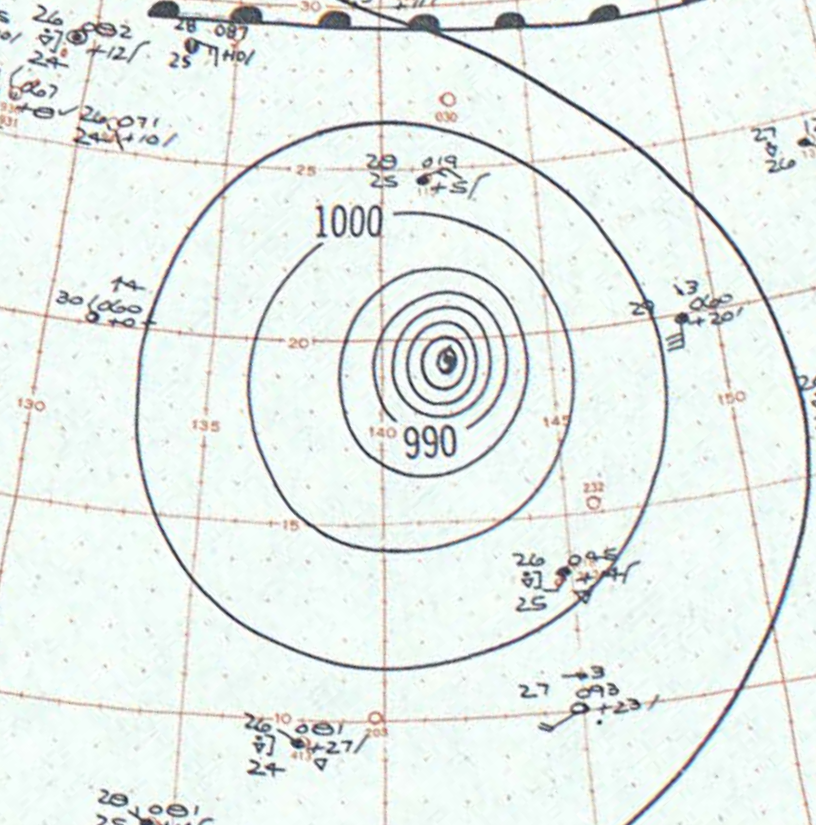
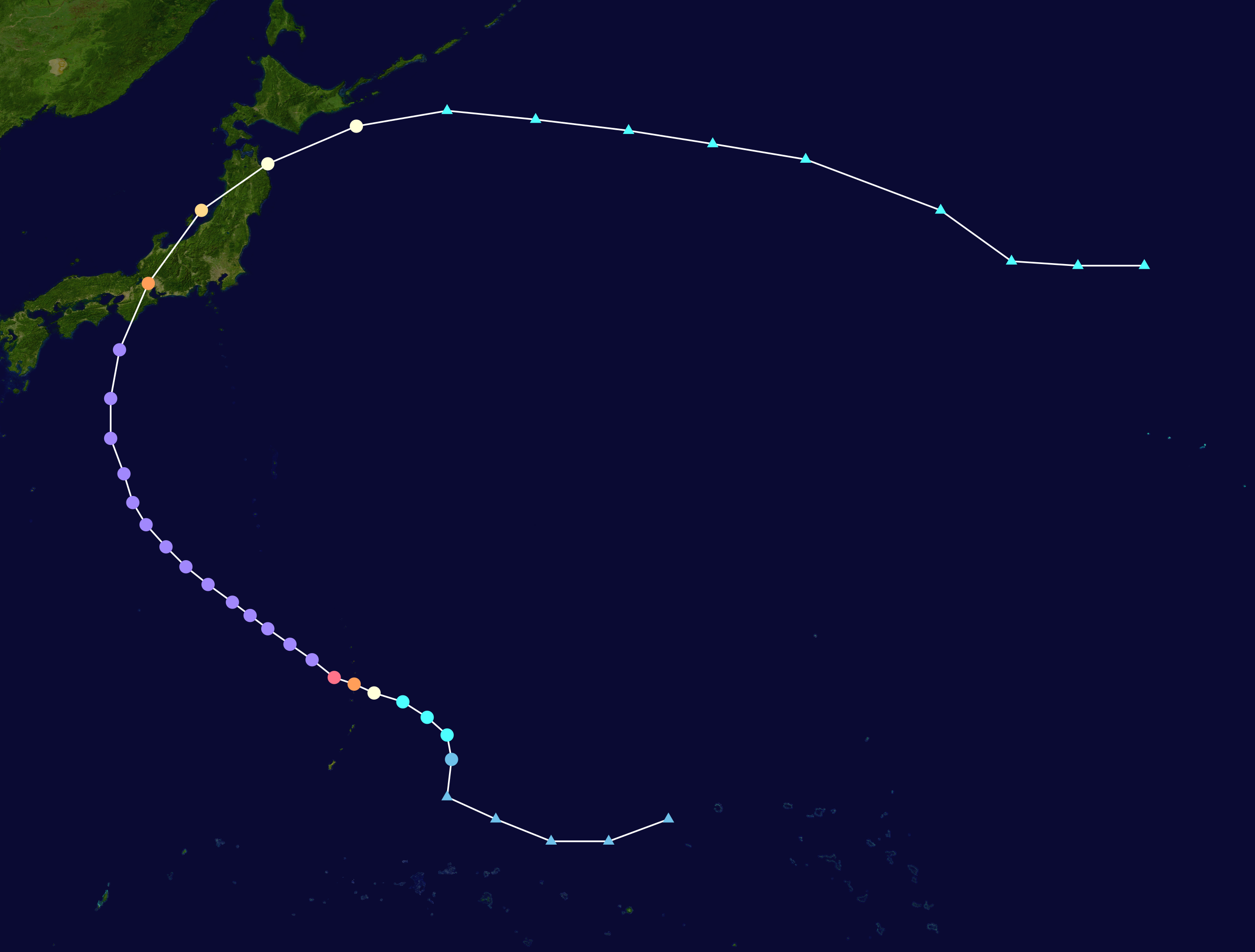
- Duration: September 21 – September 28
- Peak intensity: 305 km/h (190 mph) (1-min); 895 hPa (mbar)

Vera developed on September 20 between Guam and Chuuk State, and initially tracked westward before taking a more northerly course, reaching tropical storm strength the following day. By this point Vera had assumed a more westerly direction of movement and had begun to rapidly intensify, and reached its peak intensity on September 23 with maximum sustained winds equivalent to that of a modern-day Category 5 hurricane. With little change in strength, Vera curved and accelerated northward, resulting in a landfall on September 26 near Shionomisaki on Honshu. Atmospheric wind patterns caused the typhoon to briefly emerge into the Sea of Japan before recurving eastward and moving ashore Honshu for a second time. Movement over land greatly weakened Vera, and after reentering the North Pacific Ocean later that day, Vera transitioned into an extratropical cyclone on September 27; these remnants continued to persist for an additional two days.

Though Vera was accurately forecast and its track into Japan was well anticipated, limited coverage of telecommunications, combined with lack of urgency from Japanese media and the storm's intensity, greatly inhibited potential evacuation and disaster mitigation processes. Rainfall from the storm's outer rainbands began to cause flooding in river basins well in advance of the storm's landfall. Upon moving ashore Honshu, the typhoon brought a strong storm surge that destroyed numerous flood defense systems, inundating coastal regions and sinking ships. Damage totals from Vera reached US$600 million (equivalent to US$6.63 billion in 2025). The number of fatalities caused by Vera remain discrepant, though current estimates indicate that the typhoon caused more than 5,000 deaths, making it one of the deadliest typhoons in Japanese history. It also injured almost 39,000 people and made around 1.5 million people homeless.

=== Typhoon Amy ===
- Typhoon (JMA)
- Category 1-equivalent typhoon (SSHWS)
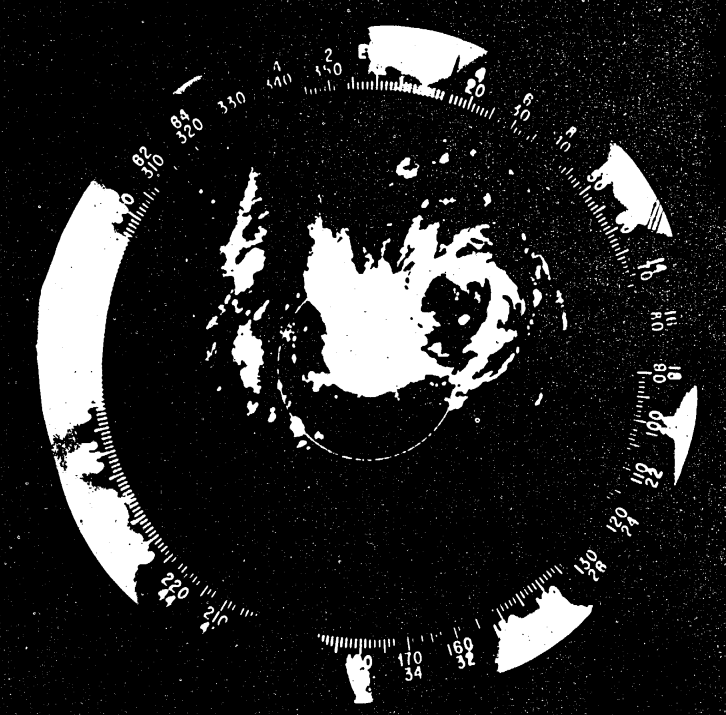
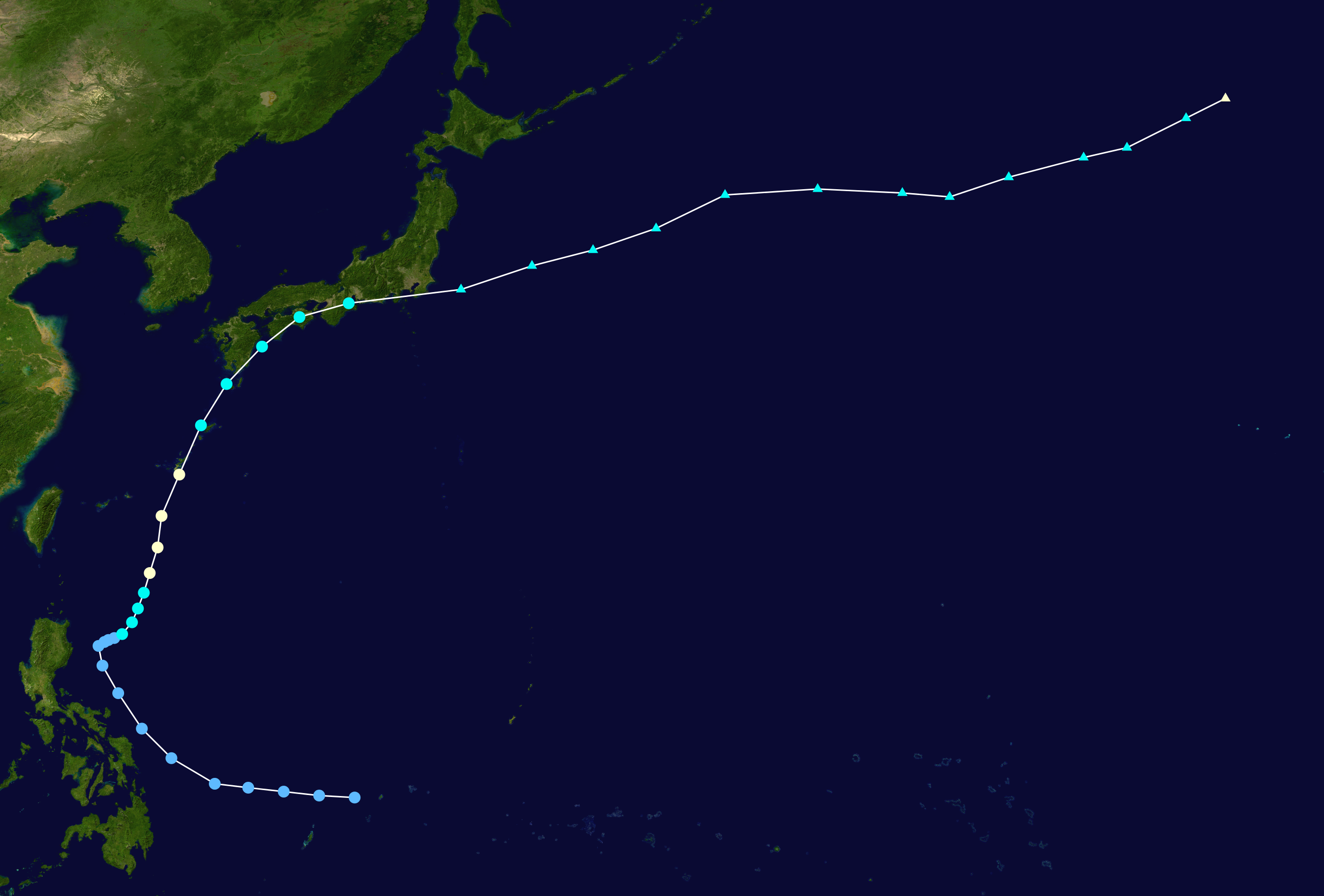
- Duration: October 3 – October 9
- Peak intensity: 120 km/h (75 mph) (1-min); 985 hPa (mbar)

Typhoon Amy developed near Yap on October 3. After strengthening and subsequent weakening, Amy struck Japan. Shortly thereafter, the system became extratropical on October 9.

=== Tropical Storm Babs ===
- Tropical storm (JMA)
- Tropical storm (SSHWS)
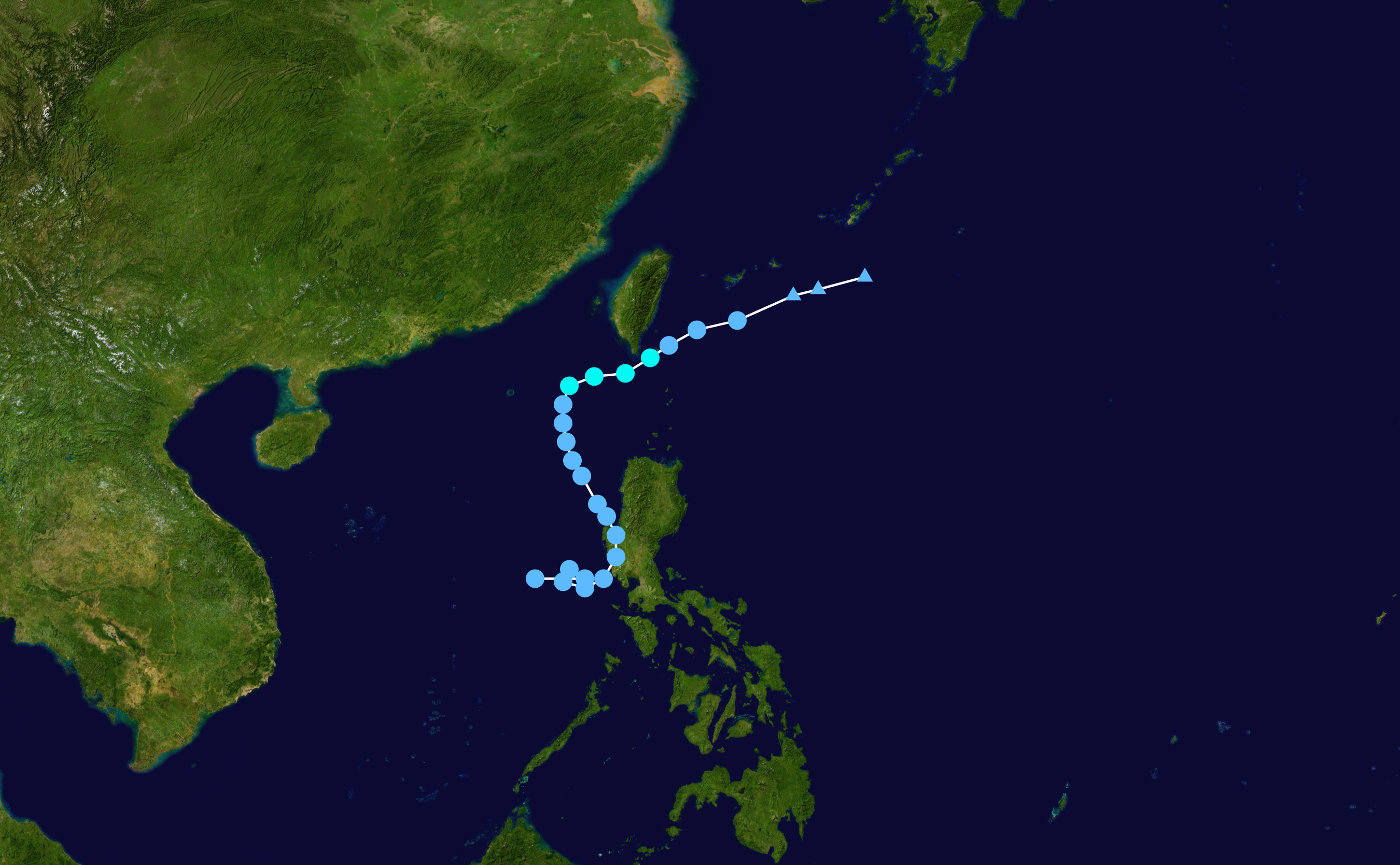
- Duration: October 5 – October 10
- Peak intensity: 75 km/h (45 mph) (1-min); 1005 hPa (mbar)

Tropical Storm Babs developed in the South China Sea on October 5. The storm struck the western side of Luzon, before entering the Pacific Ocean. By October 10, Babs dissipated south of the Ryukyu Islands.

=== Typhoon Charlotte ===
- Typhoon (JMA)
- Category 5-equivalent super typhoon (SSHWS)
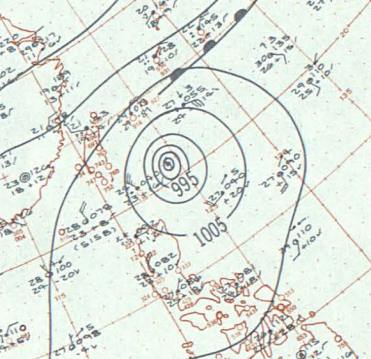
- Duration: October 9 – October 19
- Peak intensity: 270 km/h (165 mph) (1-min); 905 hPa (mbar)

An area of low pressure organized into a tropical depression on October 9 to the east of the Philippines. It moved northwestward, quickly intensifying to typhoon status on the 10th. Charlotte continued to intensify, and reached a peak of 165 mph (266 km/h) on the 13th before recurving to the northeast. Cooler, drier air weakened the typhoon, and after passing near Okinawa on the 16th it paralleled the southern coast of Japan offshore. The weakening storm turned to the east, and dissipated on the 19th. Charlotte brought a total of 24 inches (610 mm) of rain on Okinawa, causing landslides that damaged much of the island. Crop damage was severe, with 75% of the rice crop destroyed. The five feet of flooding in some areas damaged 618 homes and destroyed 275. In all, Charlotte caused 46 casualties and left 1,068 homeless.

=== Typhoon Dinah ===
- Typhoon (JMA)
- Category 5-equivalent super typhoon (SSHWS)
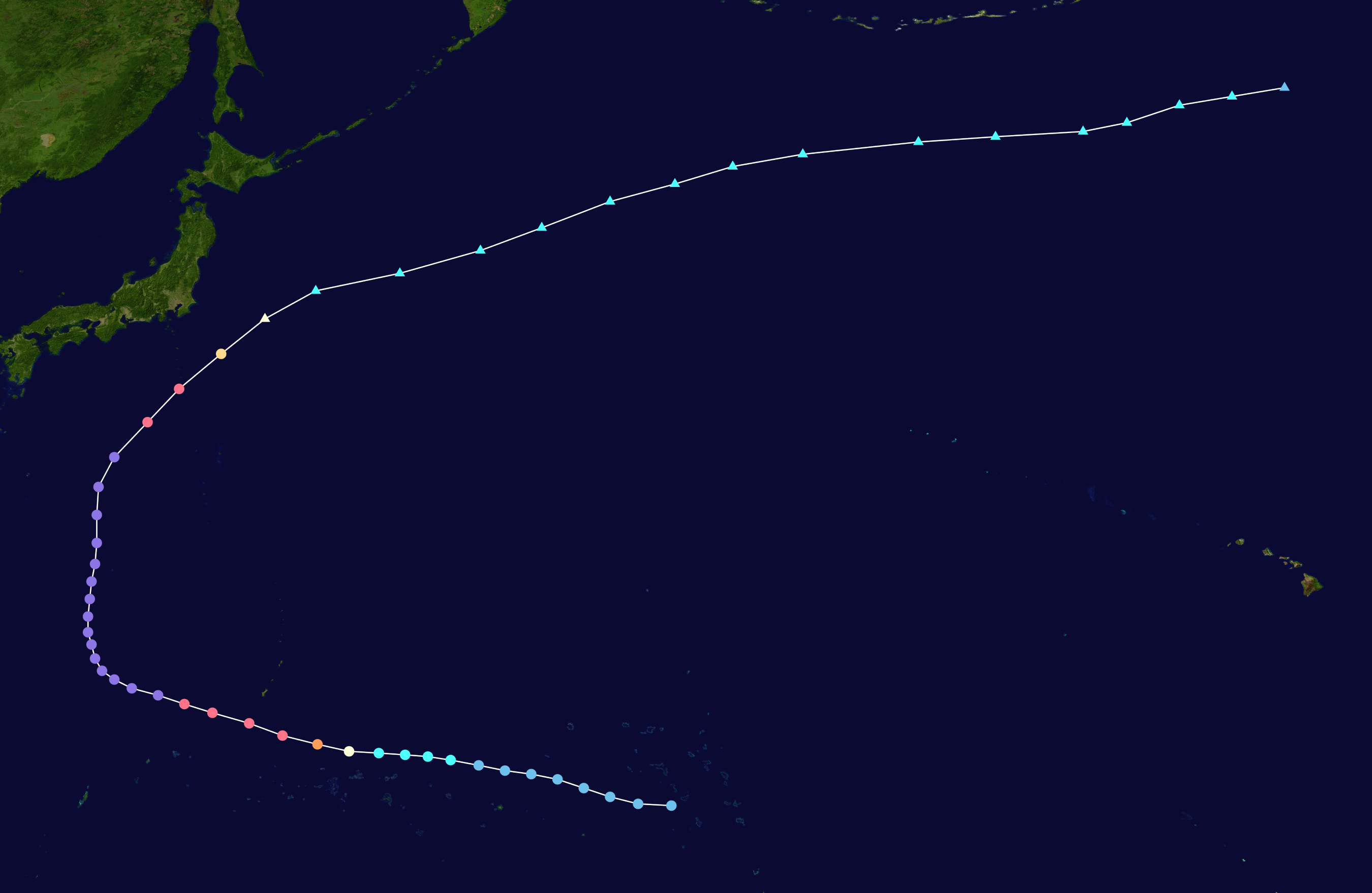
- Duration: October 14 – October 25
- Peak intensity: 280 km/h (175 mph) (1-min); 915 hPa (mbar)

Just weeks after Super Typhoon Vera, another northward moving 170 mph (270 km/h) Super Typhoon was moving northward toward Japan. Dinah's turn to the northeast spared the country, and it became extratropical on October 21 to the east of the archipelago.

=== Typhoon Emma ===
- Typhoon (JMA)
- Category 3-equivalent typhoon (SSHWS)
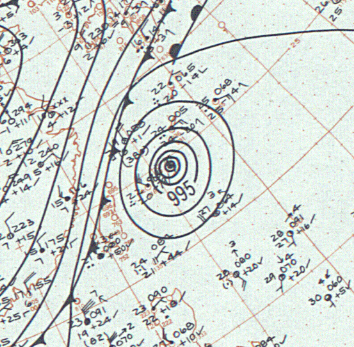
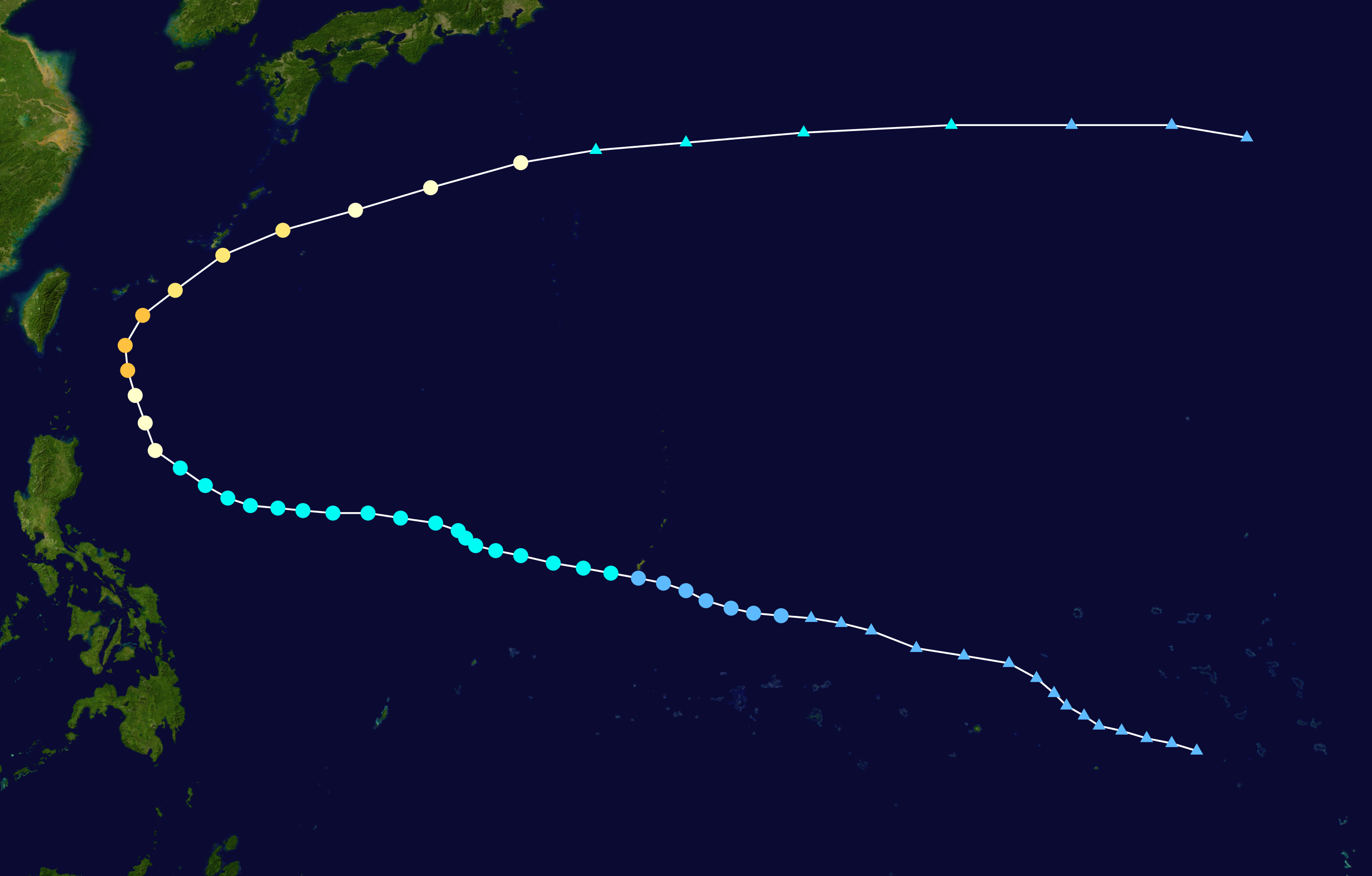
- Duration: November 5 – November 15
- Peak intensity: 205 km/h (125 mph) (1-min); 960 hPa (mbar)

An area of severe weather formed near Kwajalein Atoll on October 30, and the Japan Meteorological Agency (JMA) began tracking it as a tropical depression on November 1. The Joint Typhoon Warning Center followed suit on November 5 after finding a closed circulation, and the depression received the name Emma. The depression strengthened into a tropical storm west of Guam on November 6 and gradually gained strength. Emma became a typhoon on November 11 near Luzon, and it reached its peak sustained winds of 205 km/h; 125 mph (110 kn) later that day. The typhoon turned northeastwards and grazed Okinawa the next day. Emma steadily weakened and became extratropical on November 13, and the JMA ceased tracking the storm on November 15.

On November 12, Emma caused significant damage in Okinawa, compounding the effects of Typhoon Charlotte in October. Heavy rainfall and strong winds were reported on the islands, flooding the city of Naha and blocking access off to it due to landslides. Shops in the city lost thousands of dollars in merchandise, while crops in the territory were damaged. Minor damage was reported at American military installations, such as Kadena Air Base, where the total damage was worth US$219,586.50. Four people were killed during the storm, and two more were missing. Wind and rain were reported in Guam and the Philippines, and several ships were damaged or sunk by the storm.

=== Typhoon Freda ===
- Typhoon (JMA)
- Category 4-equivalent typhoon (SSHWS)
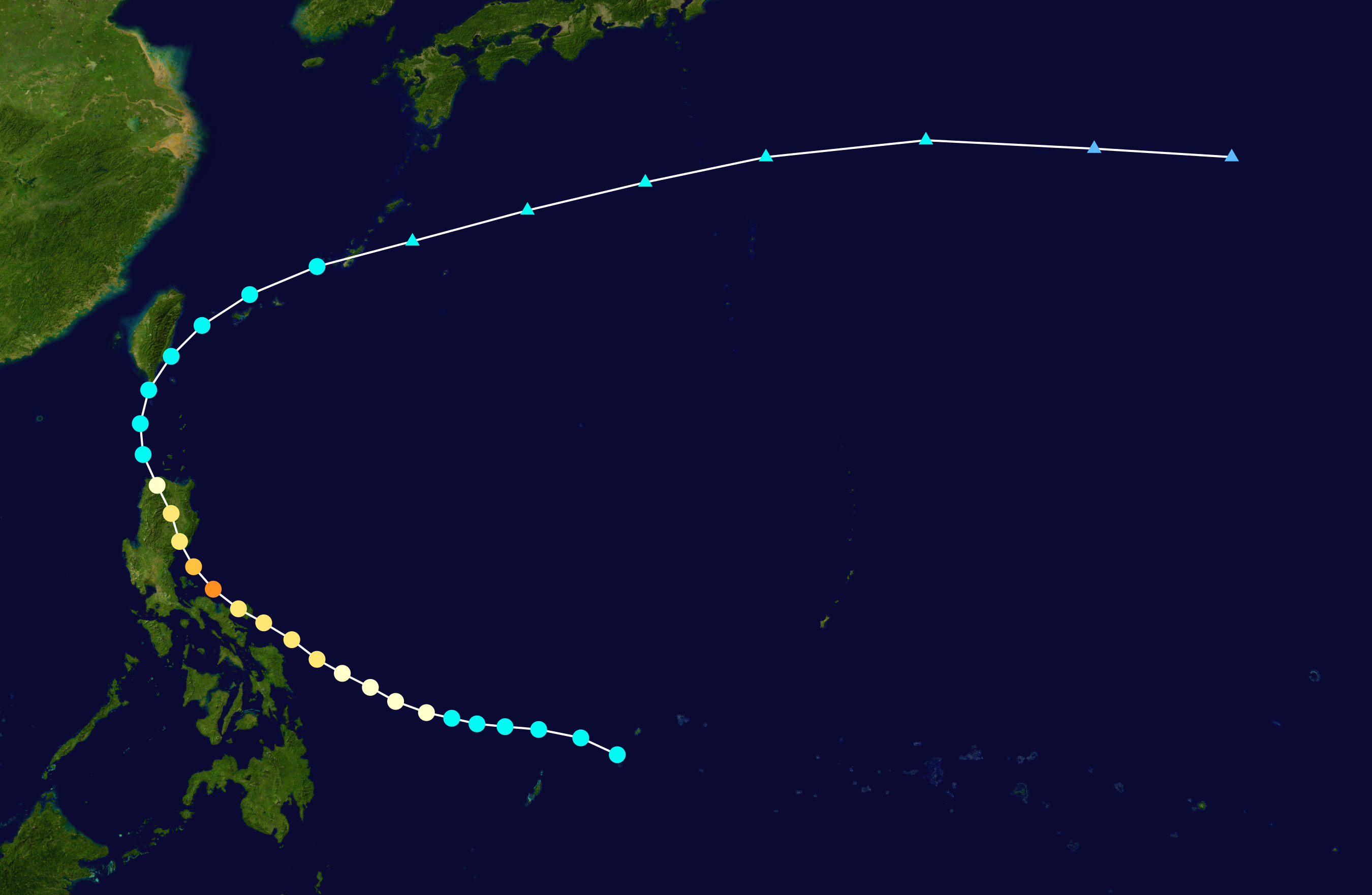
- Duration: November 13 – November 19
- Peak intensity: 215 km/h (130 mph) (1-min); 945 hPa (mbar)

A disturbance in the Intertropical Convergence Zone organized into a tropical storm to the east of the Philippines on November 13. Freda moved west-northwestward, attaining typhoon status the next day. As it paralleled the northeast coast of Luzon, it rapidly intensified to a 135 mph (217 km/h) typhoon, and made landfall on the 16th with slightly weaker winds of 120, the weakening due to land interaction. Freda rapidly weakened as it crossed the island, and turned to the north. After passing close to Taiwan on the 18th, it accelerated to the north and became extratropical on the 20th. Freda brought torrential rains to the city of Manila, driving two vessels aground. Crop damage was heavy on the southern part of the island, while 7,600 were left homeless from the flooding. Freda caused 58 fatalities as it passed through the Philippines.

=== Typhoon Gilda ===
- Typhoon (JMA)
- Category 5-equivalent super typhoon (SSHWS)
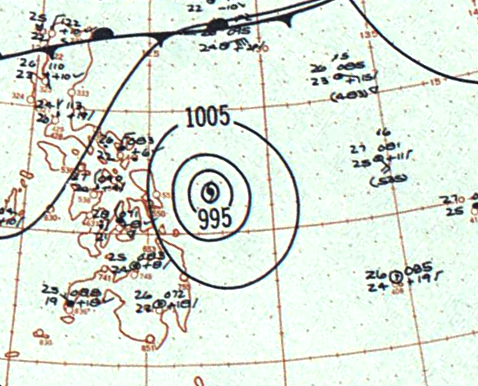
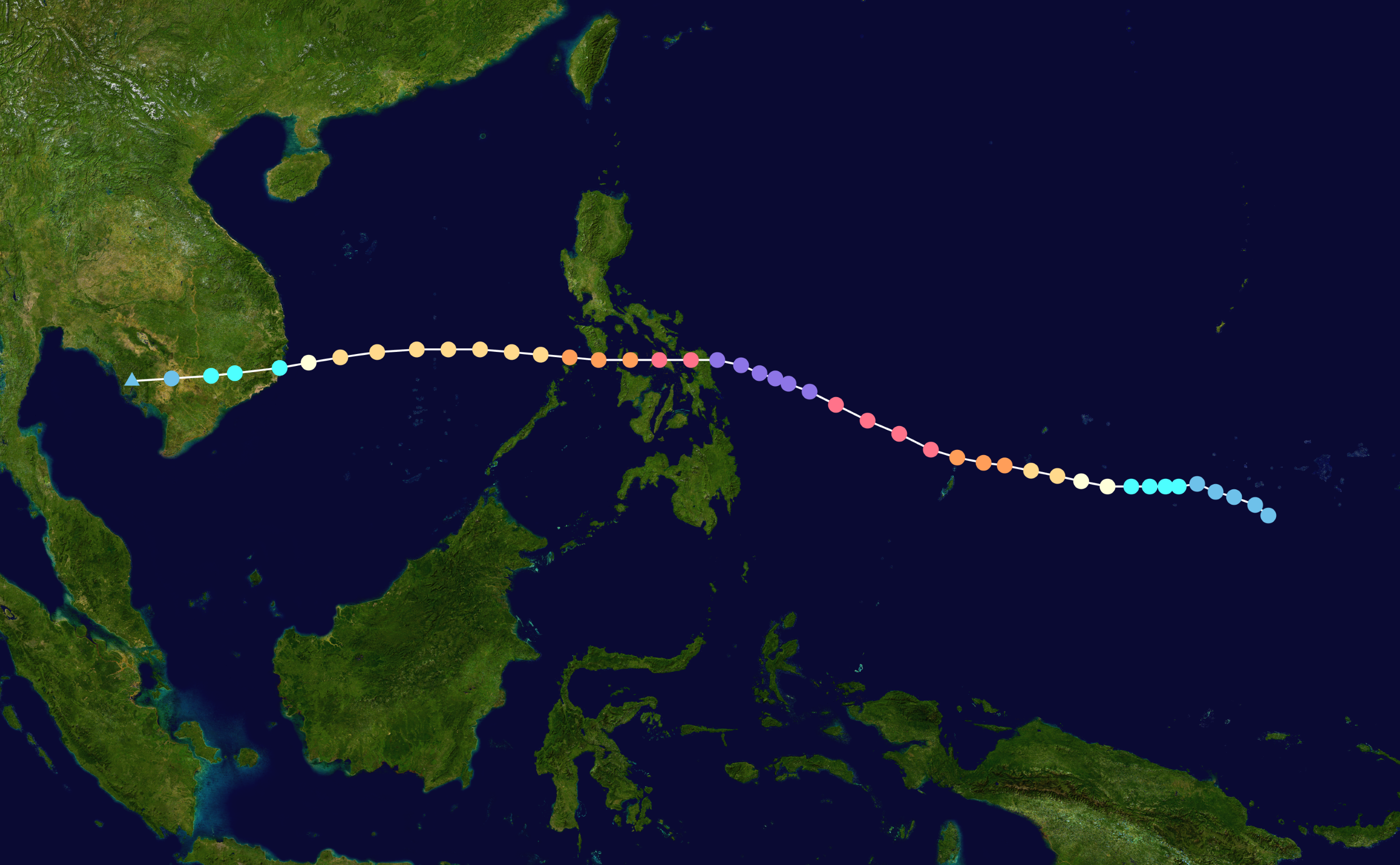
- Duration: December 11 – December 22
- Peak intensity: 280 km/h (175 mph) (1-min); 925 hPa (mbar)

On December 18, 175 mph (282 km/h) Super Typhoon Gilda made landfall on the eastern Philippines. It quickly crossed the archipelago, and weakened over the South China Sea. Gilda made landfall on southeastern Vietnam on the 21st as a tropical storm, and dissipated the next day. Gilda caused 23 casualties in the Philippines from extensive rainfall, and left nearly 60,000 homeless.

=== Typhoon Harriet ===
- Typhoon (JMA)
- Category 4-equivalent typhoon (SSHWS)
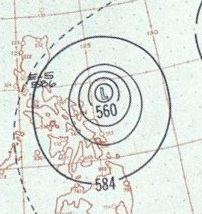
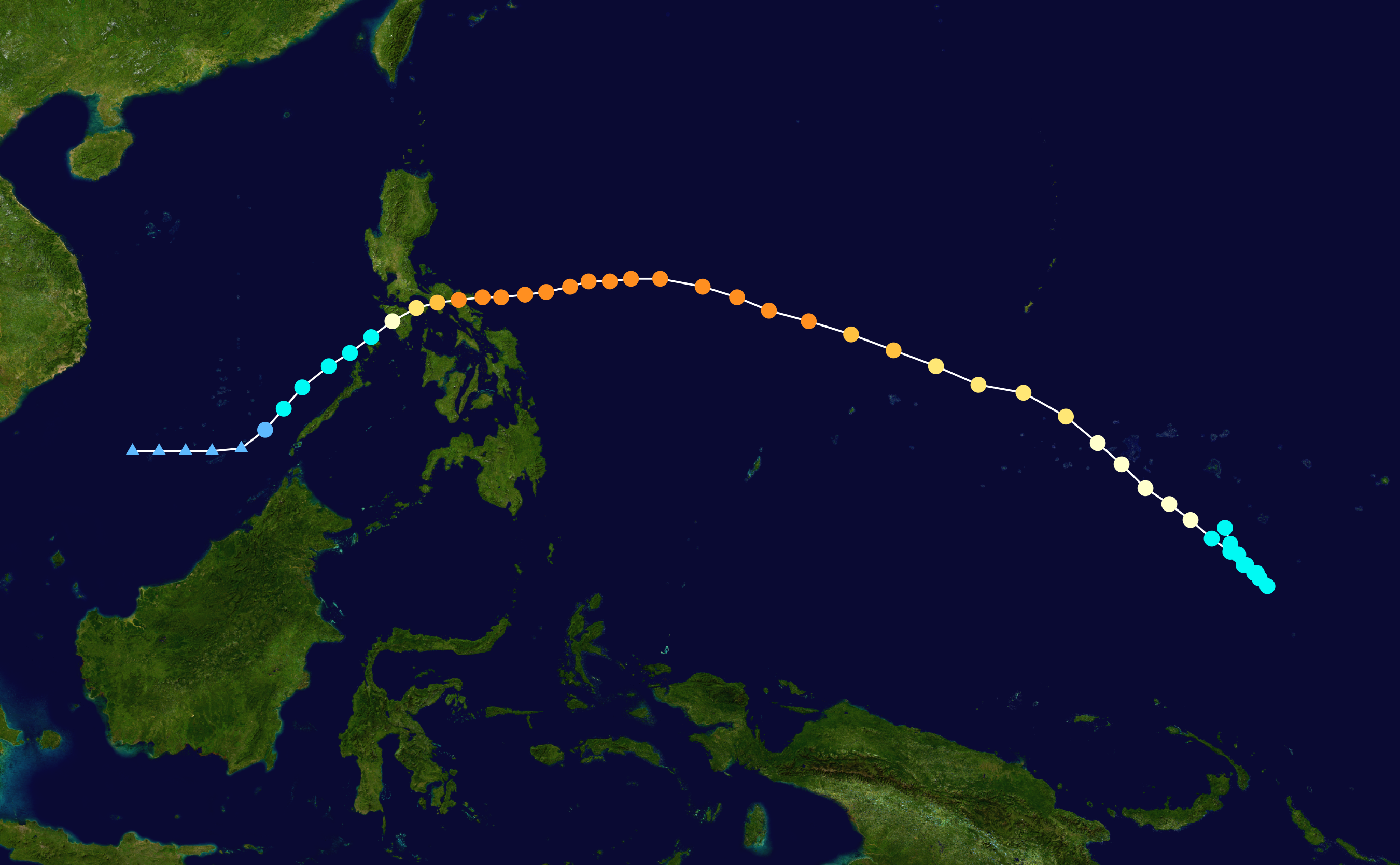
- Duration: December 22, 1959 – January 3, 1960
- Peak intensity: 240 km/h (150 mph) (1-min); 930 hPa (mbar)

On December 30, just weeks after Gilda, 150 mph (240 km/h) Typhoon Harriet hit the eastern Philippines. It weakened as it crossed the islands, and dissipated over the South China Sea on January 2. Harriet brought strong winds and rainfall to Luzon, causing considerable property and crop damage. In all, the typhoon killed 5 and left more than 12,000 homeless.

== Storm names ==
During the season, 31 systems developed in the Western Pacific, according to the JTWC, and were named by the agency. The names were drawn sequentially from a set of four alphabetical naming lists and were all feminine. Three Central Pacific storms developed and were named Dot, Patsy, and Wanda. The policy at the time was to use the Western Pacific nomenclature for the basin.

- Agnes
- Bess
- Carmen
- Della
- Elaine
- Faye
- Gloria
- Hester
- Irma
- Judy
- Kit
- Lola
- Mamie
- Nina
- Ophelia
- Phyllis
- Rita
- Susan
- Tess
- Viola
- Winnie
- Alice
- Betty
- Cora
- Doris
- Elsie
- Flossie
- Grace
- Helen
- Ida
- June
- Kathy
- Lorna
- Marie
- Nancy
- Olga
- Pamela
- Ruby 2W
- Sally 3W
- Tilda 4W
- Violet 5W
- Wilda 6W
- Anita 7W
- Billie 8W
- Clara
- Dot 6C
- Ellen 12W
- Fran 13W
- Georgia 14W
- Hope 15W
- Iris 18W
- Joan 21W
- Kate 20W
- Louise 22W
- Marge
- Nora 26W
- Opal 27W
- Patsy 29W
- Ruth 31W
- Sarah 33W
- Thelma 36W
- Vera 39W
- Wanda 13C
- Amy 40W
- Babs 41W
- Charlotte 42W
- Dinah 43W
- Emma 46W
- Freda 48W
- Gilda 56W
- Harriet 58W
- Ivy
- Jean
- Karen
- Lucille
- Mary
- Nadine
- Olive
- Polly
- Rose
- Shirley
- Trix
- Virginia
- Wendy

== See also ==
- 1959 Atlantic hurricane season
- 1950s South-West Indian Ocean cyclone seasons
- 1950s Australian region cyclone seasons
- South-West Indian Ocean cyclone seasons: 1958–59 1959–60
