= Gilbert Thompson (disambiguation) =

Gilbert Thompson may refer to:

- Gilbert Thompson (1839–1909), American typographer, draftsman, topographer, and soldier
- Gilbert Thompson (physician, born 1728) (1728–1803), English physician
- Gilbert Thompson (physician, born 1932) (1932–2026), British physician
