= Julie Hall =

Julie Hall may refer to:

- Julie Hall (golfer) (born 1967), English golfer
- Julie Hall (public health), public health specialist
