= St Thomas's Hospital Medical School =

London medical school

Coordinates: 51°29′52″N 0°7′11″W

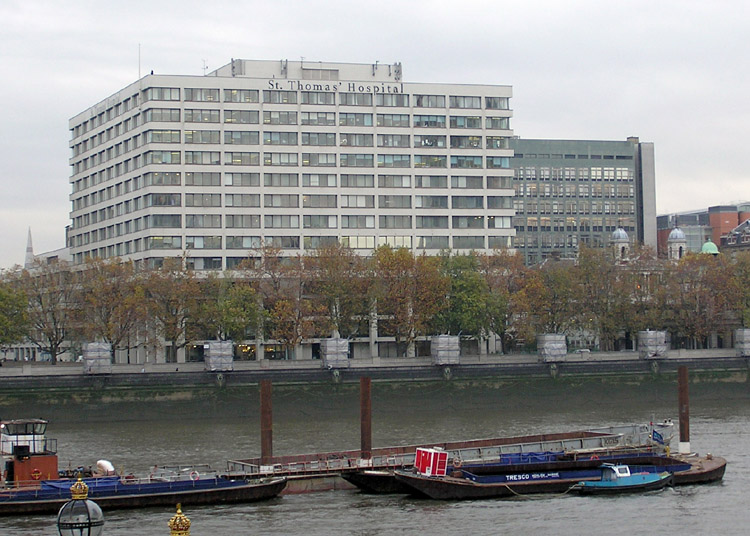
St Thomas's Hospital

St Thomas's Hospital Medical School was one of the oldest British medical schools located in London. The school ceased to exist from 1982, becoming initially part of the United Medical and Dental Schools of Guy's and St Thomas's Hospitals, and in 1998 part of the King's College London GKT School of Medical Education.

== History ==
The school was part of one of the oldest hospitals in London, St Thomas's Hospital established in 1173 but whose roots can be traced to the establishment of St Mary Overie Priory in 1106. According to historical records St Thomas's Hospital Medical School was founded in about 1550. It was admitted as a school of the University of London in 1900 but remained a constituent part of St Thomas's Hospital until 1948 when it formally became part of the university. In 1982, it merged with the medical school at Guy's Hospital to form the United Medical and Dental Schools of Guy's and St Thomas's Hospitals. In turn UMDS was absorbed by King's College London School of Medicine and Dentistry, but the dentists have since been split out into The Dental Institute.

== Name ==
Unlike the hospital which in recent times dropped the possessive "s", the medical school continued with the original spelling.

== Arms ==
Coat of arms of St Thomas's Hospital Medical School
Notes Granted 28 January 1949. The arms of the medical school are similar to those of St Thomas' hospital. The school's arms however have a flaming torch which represents light and learning and also the rod of Aesculapius, a symbol of medical practice. Escutcheon Argent, on a cross between in the first quarter a sword erect and in the fourth quarter a rod of Aesculapius gules, a torch Or inflamed proper; a chief azure, thereon a rose of the first, barbed and seeded proper, between two fleurs-de lys also of the first

== Departments ==
Department of Community Medicine

== Notable people ==
=== Notable former members of staff ===
- Thomas Wharton (1614–1673) - anatomist best known for his descriptions of the submandibular duct
- William Cheselden (1688–1752) - surgeon and specialist in the removal of bladder stones
- Astley Cooper (1768–1841) - surgeon and anatomist
- Thomas Wakley (1795–1862) - surgeon and social reformer
- Edward Headlam Greenhow (1814–1888) - first lecturer appointed at St Thomas's
- Herbert Barrie (1927-2017) - neonatologist
- Beulah Bewley (1929–2018) - campaigner for women's opportunities in medicine
- Karen Dunnell (b. 1946) - UK National Statistician
- Doug Altman (1948–2018) - statistician

=== Notable alumni ===
- John Sherwen (1749–1846) - Physician and author
- Sir Bryan Donkin (1845-1927) - physician and criminologist
- Takaki Kanehiro (1849–1920) - Japanese naval doctor, first person to discover the link between beriberi and diet.
- Charles Scott Sherrington (1857–1952) - Nobel Prize for Physiology for work on functions of neurons
- Havelock Ellis (1859–1939) - Physician, sexual psychologist and social reformer.
- Oguntola Sapara (1861–1935) - Medical doctor and activist. Known for Smallpox eradication in Nigeria.
- W. Somerset Maugham (1874–1965) - Playwright, novelist, short story writer.
- Eric Anson (1892–1969) - New Zealand's first specialist anaesthetist.
- Max Theiler (1899 – 1972) - Virologist, awarded the Nobel Prize in Physiology or Medicine in 1951 for developing a vaccine for yellow fever
- Harold Ridley (1906–2001) - ophthalmologist who invented intraocular lens
- John B. Harman (1907–1995) - president of the Medical Defence Union and chairman of the British National Formulary
- Rustom Jal Vakil (1911-1974) - Eminent Indian cardiologist, recipient of the prestigious Lasker Prize known as the American Nobel.
- David Anderson, 2nd Viscount Waverley (1911 – 1990), British cardiologist and member of the House of Lords
- Richard Doll (1912–2005) - Epidemiologist and physiologist; established link between smoking and cancer.
- John Cosh (1915 – 2005) - rheumatologist
- Richard Bayliss (1917–2006) - Physician to the Queen and head of the Medical Household
- Dame Cecily Saunders DBE OM (1918–2005) - Nurse, physician and social worker who developed the concept of the hospice and was a pioneer of palliative care.
- Humphrey Kay (1923–2009) - Haematologist
- Walter W. Holland CBE (1929–2018) - Epidemiologist and public health physician
- Anthony Yates (1930-2004) - rheumatologist and consultant, president of the British Association for Rheumatology and of the Rheumatology and Rehabilitation Section of the Royal Society of Medicine
- Mary Baines (1932–2020) - palliative care physician
- David Owen (b. 1938) - Labour Foreign Secretary and founder of the Social Democratic Party.
- Elizabeth M. Bryan (1942–2008) - Paediatrician and expert on twins.
- Jeffrey Tate (1943-2017) - Conductor
- Philip Poole-Wilson (1943–2009) - cardiologist
- Sir Gordon Duff (b. 1947) - Principal of St Hilda's College, Oxford
- Vicky Clement-Jones (1948–1987) - Founder of the British Association for Cancer United Patients.
- Gilbert Thompson (physician) (born 1932) - lipidology expert and academic
- Roger Jones (b. 1948) - professor of general practice, and editor of the British Journal of General Practice
- James Colthurst (born 1957), radiologist
- Fiona Wood AM (b. 1958) - Plastic surgeon, Australian of the Year 2005.
- Phil Hammond (b. 1962) - comedian and commentator on health issues
