= Typhoon Haiyan =

Pacific typhoon in 2013

Typhoon Haiyan (Yolanda)
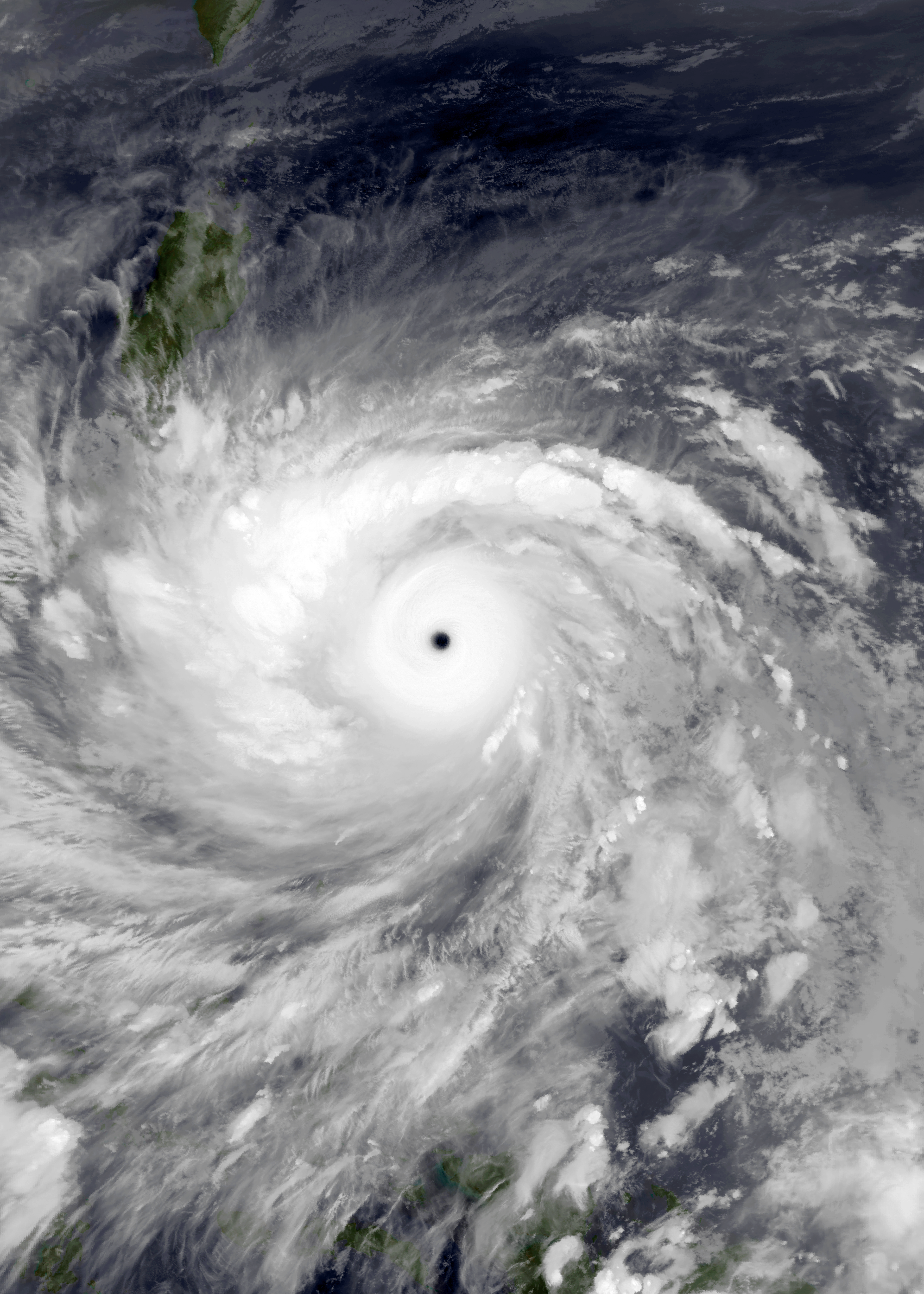
- Haiyan at peak intensity when approaching the Philippines on November 7

Meteorological history
- Formed: November 3, 2013
- Dissipated: November 11, 2013

Violent typhoon
- 10-minute sustained (JMA)
- Highest winds: 230 km/h (145 mph)
- Lowest pressure: 895 hPa (mbar); 26.43 inHg

Category 5-equivalent super typhoon
- 1-minute sustained (SSHWS/JTWC)
- Highest winds: 315 km/h (195 mph)
- Lowest pressure: 895 hPa (mbar); 26.43 inHg

Overall effects
- Fatalities: 6,352 total
- Injuries: 28,781
- Missing: 1,071
- Damage: >$2.98 billion (2013 USD) (Costliest in Philippine history)
- Areas affected: Guam, Caroline Islands, Philippines, South China, Vietnam, Taiwan
- IBTrACS
- Part of the 2013 Pacific typhoon season
- History: Meteorological history; Response: Humanitarian response; Other wikis: Commons: Haiyan images

Typhoon Haiyan, known in the Philippines as Super Typhoon Yolanda, (Note: The Japan Meteorological Agency assigns names to typhoons in the Western North Pacific and North of the equator, as the Regional Specialized Meteorological Center. PAGASA assigns local names to tropical cyclones within the Philippine Area of Responsibility. On May 1, 2015, as PAGASA added Signal No. 5, Super Typhoon (220 km/h 10 minute maximum sustained winds) and Severe Tropical Storm category, PAGASA reclassified the system as Super Typhoon Yolanda and in March 23, 2022 PAGASA lowered threshold to 185 km/h, still classified as super typhoon) was an extremely powerful and catastrophic tropical cyclone that is among the most intense tropical cyclones ever recorded. Upon making landfall, Haiyan devastated portions of Southeast Asia, particularly the Philippines, during early November 2013. It is one of the deadliest typhoons on record in the Philippines, killing at least 6,300 people in the region of Visayas alone. It was the most intense and deadliest tropical cyclone worldwide in 2013.

The 30th named storm, thirteenth typhoon, and fifth super typhoon of the 2013 Pacific typhoon season, Haiyan originated from a low-pressure area several hundred kilometers east-southeast of Pohnpei in the Federated States of Micronesia on November 2. Tracking generally westward, environmental conditions favored tropical cyclogenesis and the system developed into a tropical depression on the following day. After becoming a tropical storm and receiving the name Haiyan at 00:00 UTC on November 4, 2013, the system began a period of rapid intensification that brought it to typhoon intensity by 18:00 UTC on November 5, 2013. By November 6, 2013, the Joint Typhoon Warning Center (JTWC) assessed the system as a Category 5-equivalent super typhoon on the Saffir–Simpson hurricane wind scale (SSHWS); the storm passed over the island of Kayangel in Palau shortly after attaining this strength.

The Philippine Atmospheric, Geophysical and Astronomical Services Administration (PAGASA) estimated the average ten-minute sustained winds at 235 km/h (146 mph) and gusts up to 275 km/h (171 mph) at landfall over Guiuan, Eastern Samar. Haiyan continued to intensify; at 12:00 UTC on November 7, 2013, the Japan Meteorological Agency (JMA) upgraded the storm's maximum ten-minute sustained winds to a peak of 230 km/h (140 mph). The Hong Kong Observatory put the storm's maximum ten-minute sustained winds at 285 km/h (175 mph) prior to landfall in the central Philippines, while the China Meteorological Administration (CMA) estimated the maximum two-minute sustained winds at the time to be around 78 m/s or 280 km/h (170 mph). At the same time, the JTWC estimated the system's one-minute sustained winds at 315 km/h (195 mph), making Haiyan one of the strongest tropical cyclone ever observed based on wind speed.

At 20:40 UTC on November 7, 2013, the eye of the typhoon made its first landfall in the Philippines at Guiuan, Eastern Samar at maximum strength. Gradually weakening, the storm made five additional landfalls in the country before emerging over the South China Sea. Turning northwestward, the typhoon eventually struck northern Vietnam as a severe tropical storm on November 10, 2013. Haiyan was last noted as a tropical depression by the JMA on the following day.

The first warning noted for Haiyan was in November 3, 2013, when a storm warning arose in the Federated States of Micronesia, specifically in the Chuuk Lagoon, Losap, and Poluwat, gradually expanding to other towns as well. Warnings rose for a second time in Micronesia, before being discontinued. In the Philippines, PAGASA raised Signal No. 1 on November 6, before the landfall of Haiyan. More provinces were included, until Signal No. 4, the highest warning, was raised. Other preparations were made, such as class suspensions and evacuations. In China, an emergency was declared in three provinces, causing vessels to be brought back to shore. In Vietnam, the highest emergency level was announced, causing thousands of people to be evacuated.

In Micronesia, heavy rains scattered in most of the places, causing one canoe house and three other houses to be destroyed. Other than houses, many trees were downed. In Palau, houses were also destroyed. Power outages were reported, with a total of 69 people being displaced. In Taiwan, eight people died due to strong waves. One person was also declared missing in Hong Kong. In Southern China, extensive flooding occurred, killing 30 people and destroying 900 homes. In Vietnam, heavy rains battered the country, killing 18 people and injuring 93.

The typhoon caused catastrophic destruction in the Visayas, particularly on the islands of Samar and Leyte. According to UN officials, about 11 million people were affected and many were left homeless; many people are still missing as a result of this storm. People are still affected today from housing issues and homelessness, and the economy is still affected.

Due to its extensive deaths and damage, the name Haiyan was retired in 2014 and replaced with Bailu. It was first used in the 2019 season.

== Meteorological history ==
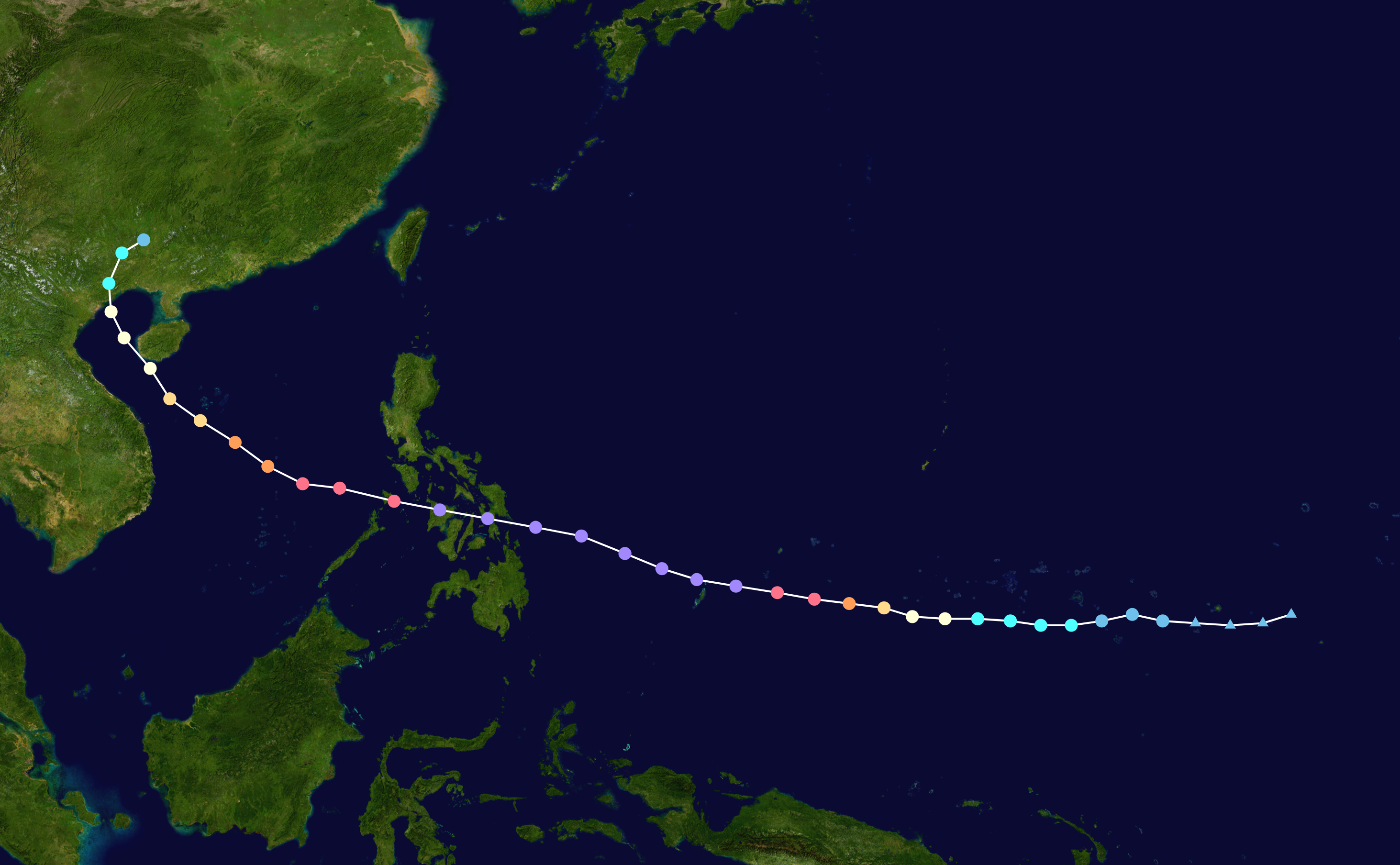
Map plotting the storm's track and intensity, according to the Saffir–Simpson scale Map key Saffir–Simpson scale Tropical depression (≤38 mph, ≤62 km/h) Tropical storm (39–73 mph, 63–118 km/h) Category 1 (74–95 mph, 119–153 km/h) Category 2 (96–110 mph, 154–177 km/h) Category 3 (111–129 mph, 178–208 km/h) Category 4 (130–156 mph, 209–251 km/h) Category 5 (≥157 mph, ≥252 km/h) Unknown Storm type Tropical cyclone Subtropical cyclone Extratropical cyclone, remnant low, tropical disturbance, or monsoon depression

On November 2, the Joint Typhoon Warning Center (JTWC) began monitoring a broad low-pressure area about 425 kilometers (264 miles) east-southeast of Pohnpei, one of the states in the Federated States of Micronesia. (Note: The Joint Typhoon Warning Center is a joint United States Navy – United States Air Force task force that issues tropical cyclone warnings for the western Pacific Ocean and other regions.) As the system moved through a region favoring tropical cyclogenesis, the Japan Meteorological Agency (JMA) classified it as a tropical depression early on November 3. (Note: The Japan Meteorological Agency (JMA) is the official Regional Specialized Meteorological Center for the western Pacific Ocean.)

The system quickly intensified into a tropical storm, prompting the JMA to assign it the name Haiyan at 00:00 UTC on November 4. (Note: The name Haiyan (Mandarin: 海燕, [xaɪ˧˩˧ jɛn˥˩]) was contributed by China and means storm petrel in Mandarin.) Tracking generally westward along the southern periphery of a subtropical ridge, rapid intensification ensued by November 5 as a central dense overcast with an embedded eye developing; the JMA classified Haiyan as a typhoon later that day. On November 6, the Philippine Atmospheric, Geophysical and Astronomical Services Administration (PAGASA) assigned the storm the local name Yolanda as it approached the Philippine Area of Responsibility.

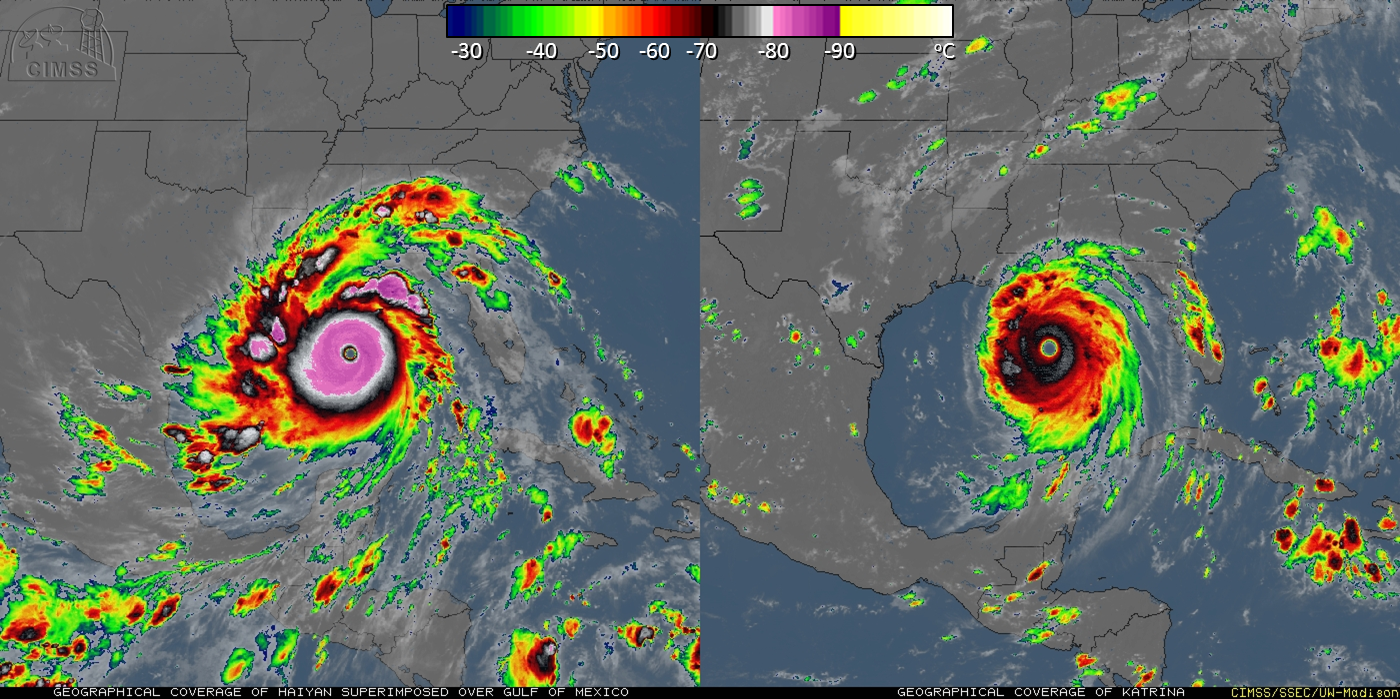
Geographical images of Typhoon Haiyan (superimposed) and Hurricane Katrina (2005) in the Gulf of Mexico for size and cloud top temperature comparison

Intensification slowed somewhat during the day, though the JTWC estimated the storm to have attained Category 5-equivalent super typhoon status on the Saffir–Simpson hurricane wind scale (SSHWS) around 12:00 UTC. (Note: A super typhoon is defined as a tropical cyclone with one-minute sustained winds of at least 240 km/h (150 mph).) Later, the eye of the typhoon passed over the island of Kayangel in Palau.

Around 12:00 UTC on November 7, Haiyan attained ten-minute sustained winds of 230 km/h (140 mph) and a minimum central pressure of 895 mbar (hPa; 26.43 inHg). Six hours later, the JTWC estimated Haiyan to have attained one-minute sustained winds of 315 km/h (196 mph) and gusts up to 380 km/h (240 mph). The storm displayed some characteristics of an annular tropical cyclone, though a strong convective band remained present along the western side of the system.

Animated enhanced infrared satellite loop of Typhoon Haiyan from peak intensity to landfall in the Philippines

At 20:40 UTC on November 7, Haiyan made landfall in Guiuan, Eastern Samar at peak intensity. The JTWC's own estimate of one-minute sustained winds of 305 km/h (190 mph) would, by that measure, make Haiyan the most powerful storm ever recorded to strike land. This record was later broken by Typhoon Goni in 2020. Interaction with land caused a slight degradation of the storm's structure, though it remained an exceptionally-powerful storm when it struck Tolosa, Leyte around 23:00 UTC. The typhoon made four additional landfalls as it traversed the Visayas: Daanbantayan and Bantayan Island in Cebu, Concepcion in Iloilo, and Busuanga Island in Palawan.

Haiyan, with its core disrupted by land interaction with the Philippines, emerged over the South China Sea late on November 8. Environmental conditions ahead of the storm soon became less favorable, as cool stable air began wrapping into the western side of the storm's circulation. Continuing across the South China Sea, Haiyan turned more northwesterly late on November 9 and through November 10, as it moved around the southwestern edge of the subtropical ridge previously steering it westward. Rapid weakening ensued as Haiyan approached its final landfall in Vietnam, ultimately moving ashore in the country near Haiphong around 21:00 UTC, as a severe tropical storm. Once onshore, the storm quickly deteriorated and was last noted as it dissipated over Guangxi Zhuang Autonomous Region, China, on November 11.

== Preparations ==
=== Micronesia and Palau ===
Upon JTWC's declaration of Tropical Depression 31W on November 3, a tropical storm warning was issued for Chuuk Lagoon, Losap, and Poluwat in the Federated States of Micronesia. Further west, Faraulep, Satawal, and Woleai, were placed under a typhoon watch while Fananu and Ulul were placed under a tropical storm watch. The following day, the tropical storm warning expanded to include Satawal while a typhoon warning was issued for Woleai. Much of Yap State and the islands of Koror and Kayangel in Palau were placed under a typhoon watch. The government issued a mandatory evacuation for Kayangel, and although most residents ignored the warning, they all survived the storm. As Haiyan progressed westward, the easternmost advisories were gradually discontinued. As Haiyan intensified into a typhoon on November 5, warnings were raised across Palau and Yap State. Government offices in Melekeok were used as an evacuation building for Palau. Despite mandatory evacuation orders, most residents on Kayangel remained on the island and rode out the typhoon.

=== Philippines ===
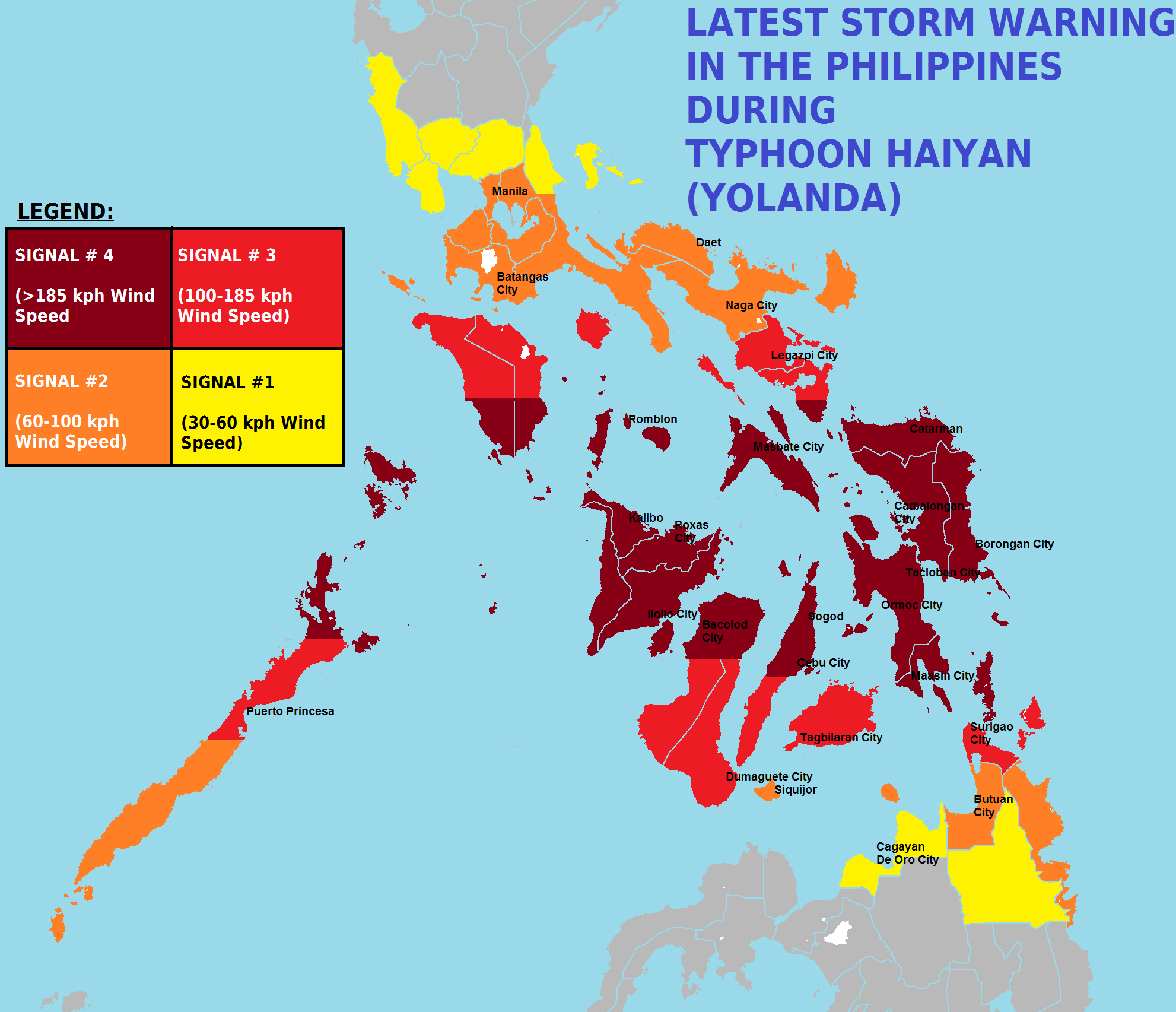
PSWS Map in the Philippines during the passage of Typhoon Haiyan (Yolanda)

Shortly before Haiyan entered the Philippine Area of Responsibility on November 6, PAGASA raised Public Storm Warning Signal (PSWS) No.1, the lowest of four levels, for much of the Visayas and Mindanao. As the storm continued to approach the country, warnings expanded into Luzon and increased in severity for eastern areas. By the evening of November 7, PSWS No. 4, the highest level of warning which indicates winds in excess of 185 km/h (115 mph) are expected, was raised for Biliran Island, Eastern Samar, Leyte, Northern Cebu, Metro Cebu, Samar, and Southern Leyte. Through November 8, the coverage of PSWS No. 4 continued to expand, with areas in southern Luzon being included.

Officials placed police officers in the Bicol Region ahead of the storm. In the provinces of Samar and Leyte, classes were canceled, and residents in flood- and landslide-prone areas were required to evacuate. Some of the storm-threatened areas were affected by an earlier earthquake in Bohol. Then-Philippine President Noynoy Aquino requested the military to deploy planes and helicopters to the region expected to be affected. As Haiyan was moving very fast, PAGASA issued warnings at different levels to about 60 of the 80 provinces, including the capital Metro Manila. On November 8, the International Charter on Space and Major Disasters was activated, providing widespread charitable satellite coverage to relief organizations.

=== Southern China ===
The State Flood Control and Drought Relief Headquarters hoisted a level three emergency response in the provinces of Hainan, Guangdong and Guangxi. All fishing vessels were urged to return to ports by noon on November 9. The Hong Kong Observatory issued the Strong Monsoon Signal at 19:10 HKT on November 9, and it was still in place on November 13.

=== Vietnam ===
On November 8, Prime Minister Nguyễn Tấn Dũng activated the highest state of preparedness in the country. Approximately 600,000 people across southern and central provinces were evacuated while a further 200,000 were evacuated in northern provinces. Alerts were sent to 85,328 seagoing vessels, with a collective crew of 385,372 people, to sail to safer waters away from the storm. Requests were sent to China, Malaysia, Indonesia, and the Philippines to aid any fishermen who needed immediate shelter from the typhoon. Threatening Vietnam after two other typhoons, Wutip and Nari, there were concerns that the storm would cause significant damage to homes with makeshift repairs. Roughly 460,000 military personnel and other authorities were mobilized to assist in evacuation efforts. Hundreds of flights were canceled across the country while schools were closed on November 11. On the small island of Cồn Cỏ, all residents were moved to underground shelters with enough supplies for several days. The International Federation of Red Cross and Red Crescent Societies (IFRC) branches in Vietnam prepared relief stockpiles, consisting of food, water, housing material, and ₫6.6 billion (US$310,000) in funds. The local United Nations Resident Coordinator, Pratibha Mehta, praised the government's actions and credited them with saving numerous lives. However, there were complaints from many residents that the warnings came too late.

== Impact ==
Fatalities by region
Region	Deaths	Missing
Philippines	6,300	1,061
Vietnam	14	4
Mainland China	30	6
Taiwan	8	0
Total	6,352	1,071

=== Micronesia ===
As the storm brushed Eauripik, strong winds and heavy rain battered much of Micronesia. In Eauripik, one canoe house and three residential properties were damaged and banana and breadfruit trees were damaged. In Woleai, banana and breadfruit trees were damaged. In Ifalik, minor inundation at coastal areas and banana and breadfruit trees were damaged.

=== Palau ===
On Kayangel in Palau, a high storm surge damaged several houses, while strong winds downed trees. Despite residents' refusal to evacuate, no fatalities or major injuries took place on the island. Helicopters were flown to the island to survey the damage and provide relief supplies. The government planned to evacuate those who were left homeless from the island. Koror, Babeldaob and Kayangel each lost access to water and power. In Koror, winds reaching as high as 120 km/h (75 mph) blew out rooftops and downed trees and power lines. A causeway linking an offshore hospital to the main island was temporarily shut down after being inundated by water. On the northern end of Babeldaob, Haiyan damaged schools and buildings. Lying closest to Haiyan at the time of the typhoon's passage, Kayangel was flooded in its entirety, and all homes were destroyed. Though no people were killed there, 69 others were displaced by the storm.

=== Philippines ===
Deadliest Philippine typhoons
Rank	Storm	Season	Fatalities	Ref.
1	Yolanda (Haiyan)	2013	6,300	
2	Uring (Thelma)	1991	5,101–8,000	
3	Pablo (Bopha)	2012	1,901	
4	"Angela"	1867	1,800	
5	Winnie	2004	1,593	
6	"October 1897"	1897	1,500	
7	Nitang (Ike)	1984	1,426	
8	Reming (Durian)	2006	1,399	
9	Frank (Fengshen)	2008	1,371	(Note: The death and missing columns includes deaths caused by Typhoon Fengshen (Frank), in the MV Princess of the Stars disaster.)
10	Sendong (Washi)	2011	1,292–2,546	

Typhoon Haiyan, called Yolanda in the Philippines, caused catastrophic damage throughout much of the islands of Leyte, where cities and towns were largely destroyed. By April 17, 2016, the National Disaster Risk Reduction and Management Council (NDRRMC) confirmed 6,300 fatalities across the country, 5,902 of those taking place in the Eastern Visayas. However, the true death toll remains unclear. Haiyan also caused 28,688 injuries, destroyed 550,928 houses and damaged 589,404 others.

In Surigao City, 281.9 mm (11.10 in) of rainfall was recorded, much of which fell in under 12 hours. Storm surges were also recorded in many places. In the island of Leyte and Samar, PAGASA measured 5–6 m (16–20 ft) waves. In Tacloban, Leyte, the terminal building of Tacloban Airport was destroyed by a 5.2 m (17 ft) storm surge up to the height of the second story. Along the airport, a storm surge of 4 m (13 ft) was estimated. Waves of 4.6 m (15 ft) were also estimated. On the western coast of Samar, the storm surge was not as significant.

Haiyan's first landfall was at Guiuan in Eastern Samar, where the typhoon arrived at 4:40 am. Nearly all structures in the township suffered at least partial damage, many of which were completely flattened. For several days following Haiyan's first landfall, the damage situation in the fishing town remained unclear due to a lack of communication in and out of the area. The damage could finally be assessed after Philippine Air Force staff arrived in Guiuan on November 10. Prior to this, a local priest was able to take his motorbike from Guiuan to the cities of Catbalogan and Calbayog (also in Samar) armed with photos of the devastation, shot on his mobile phone.

Weather radar reflectivity loop of Haiyan's landfall on Leyte Island. Tacloban was struck by the northern eyewall, the most powerful part of the storm; it obliterated much of the city.

There was widespread devastation from the storm surge in Tacloban especially in San Jose, with many buildings being destroyed, trees knocked over or broken, and cars piled up. The low-lying areas on the eastern side of Tacloban were hit the hardest, with some areas completely washed away. Flooding also extended for 1 km (0.62 mi) inland on the east coast of the province. City administrator Tecson John Lim stated that roughly 90 percent of the city had been destroyed. Journalists on the ground have described the devastation as, "off the scale, and apocalyptic". Most families in Samar and Leyte lost some family members or relatives; families came in from outlying provinces looking for relatives, especially children, who may have been washed away. The entire first floor of the Tacloban City Convention Center, which was serving as an evacuation shelter, was submerged by storm surges. Many residents in the building were caught off-guard by the fast-rising waters and subsequently drowned or were injured in the building.

Although wind speeds were extreme, the major cause of damage and loss of life appears to have been from the storm surge. The major focus of the devastation appears to have been on the east coast of Samar and Leyte, with a particular focus on Tacloban, because of its location between Samar and Leyte, and the large population in low-lying areas. Philippine Department of the Interior and Local Government (DILG) Secretary Mar Roxas said the scale of the relief operation that was now required was overwhelming, with some places described as a wasteland of mud and debris.

Sebastian Rhodes Stampa, head of a UN disaster assessment coordination team, said there was "destruction on a massive scale" in Tacloban. "There are cars thrown like tumbleweeds and the streets are strewn with debris. The last time I saw something of this scale was in the aftermath of the [2004] Indian Ocean tsunami." There was little communication in the city and no mobile phone coverage. Up the east coast of Leyte, there were numerous towns and villages that were completely cut off without any assistance. Large parts of Leyte and Samar were without power for weeks.

Costliest Philippine typhoons
Rank	Storm	Season	Damage		Ref.
Rank	Storm	Season	PHP	USD	Ref.
1	Yolanda (Haiyan)	2013	₱95.5 billion	$2.98 billion	
2	Odette (Rai)	2021	₱51.7 billion	$968 million	
3	Glenda (Rammasun)	2014	₱38.6 billion	$771 million	
4	Pablo (Bopha)	2012	₱36.9 billion	$724 million	
5	Ompong (Mangkhut)	2018	₱33.9 billion	$627 million	
6	Pepeng (Parma)	2009	₱27.3 billion	$591 million	
7	Ulysses (Vamco)	2020	₱20.2 billion	$420 million	
8	Crising (Wipha)	2025	₱18.4 billion	$373 million	
9	Kristine (Trami)	2024	₱18.4 billion	$373 million	
10	Rolly (Goni)	2020	₱17.9 billion	$371 million	

The storm crossed the Visayas region for almost a day, causing widespread flooding. In Cebu and Bohol, struck by a magnitude 7.2 earthquake two weeks before, cities were also severely devastated. During the morning of November 8, media stations across the country were able to broadcast live the destruction of Haiyan. However, before the afternoon, all communications on the Visayas region failed. The Presidential Communications Department of President Benigno Aquino III had difficulty contacting DILG Secretary Mar Roxas and Defense Secretary Voltaire Gazmin in Tacloban to plan relief. Widespread power interruptions, landslides, and flash floods were also reported. Major roads were blocked by trees, and impassable. 453 domestic and international airline flights were canceled. Some airports were also closed on November 8 and 9. Ferries were affected. Relief and rescue efforts were underway by November 9, but some places remained isolated and out of communication due to severe damage.

Haiyan tossed up large car-sized boulders, the heaviest of them weighing 180 tons, onto Calicoan Island in Eastern Samar, of which a few were carried uphill 10 m (33 ft). This is considered the biggest weight ever moved during a tropical cyclone since record-keeping began. NDRRMC finally confirmed a total of 6,300 deaths in the Philippines, and total damages were estimated at PH₱95.48 billion (US$2.2 billion).

=== Taiwan ===
Along the coast of Gongliao District, New Taipei, 16 people were swept out to sea by three 8 m (26 ft) waves. After several hours of search and rescue, eight were hospitalized while the other eight drowned. This was considered the largest loss of life from waves in Taiwan in several years. In May 2014, the Taiwan Keelung District Prosecutors Office confirmed that Typhoon Haiyan was responsible for eight deaths. Agricultural damage in Tainan were amounted to NT$400–500 million (US$13.5–16.9 million).

=== Hong Kong ===
One person also went missing off the coast of Lantau Island, Hong Kong.

=== Southern China ===
Typhoon Haiyan reached Hainan Province, where severe damage took place and six people were killed in various incidents. The hardest hit area was Qionghai, where roughly 3,500 people across 20 villages were isolated due to extensive flooding.

30 people were killed, while direct economic losses in China amounted to ¥4.58 billion (US$752 million). An estimated 1.21 million people were affected, of whom 26,300 were evacuated. Two people died while four others went missing after a car fell off a flooded road into a river near Beihai, Guangxi. Losses throughout Guangxi amounted to ¥275 million (US$45.2 million). Approximately 900 homes and 25,500 hectares of crops were destroyed, while 8,500 homes were damaged. Additionally, an estimated 3 million people were affected by the storm throughout Southern China. A cargo ship broke moorings at Sanya, Hainan on November 8; three members of the crew drowned while four others went missing.

=== Vietnam ===
Haiyan produced high winds and widespread heavy rainfall which affected northern Vietnam. Rainfall totals of up to 461 mm (18.1 in) and wind gusts of up to 147 km/h (91 mph) were recorded. Ten people were killed while they were preparing for Haiyan's landfall, while no one was killed after the system made landfall; however, 4 people are missing in Quảng Ninh Province. In all, Haiyan killed 18 people, and left two missing with 93 others being injured. Economic losses in Vietnam amounted to ₫669 billion (US$31.67 million).

== Aftermath and retirement ==
Deadliest Pacific typhoons
Rank	Typhoon	Season	Fatalities	Ref.
1	"Shanghai"	1931	302,040	
2	Nina	1975	229,000	
3	Unnamed	1780	100,000	
4	Unnamed	1862	80,000	
5	"Shantou"	1922	60,000	
6	"China"	1912	50,000	
7	"Hong Kong"	1937	10,000	
8	Joan	1964	7,000	
9	Haiyan	2013	6,352	
10	Vera	1959	>5,000	
Main article: List of tropical cyclone records

Due to the catastrophic loss of life caused by the storm, the name Haiyan was retired from its naming lists during the 2014 annual session of the ESCAP/WMO Typhoon Committee, and was therefore replaced by the name Bailu. The name was first used in the 2019 season. PAGASA also announced that the name Yolanda would be stricken off the typhoon naming lists. PAGASA chose the name Yasmin to replace Yolanda for the 2017 season, which went unused in 2017.

=== Philippines ===
Map of damaged houses by municipality showing track of storm, from the United Nations, as of November 18, 2013

By November 11, the provinces of Aklan, Capiz, Cebu, Iloilo, Leyte, Palawan, and Samar were placed under a state of national calamity, allowing the government to use state funds for relief and rehabilitation and to control prices of basic goods. Additionally, approximately ₱30.6 million (US$700,000) had been allocated in relief assistance by the NDRRMC. Local and national agencies deployed a collective 18,177 personnel, 844 vehicles, 44 seagoing vessels, and 31 aircraft for various operations. CBCP also declared 8 days of mourning for victims of the typhoon on the same date.

World Health Organization Representative in the Philippines Dr. Julie Hall noted that while many survivors requiring medical attention in the first week suffer from trauma and fractures, the concern shifts toward chronic conditions as the weeks pass. The WHO coordinated the massive international response to help the Philippine government meet the acute need for healthcare services in the affected areas.

Animated satellite comparison of power outages across the Visayas following Typhoon Haiyan

Extreme damage to infrastructure throughout the region posed logistical problems that greatly slowed relief efforts. Though aid was flown into local airports, most of it remained there as roads remained closed. According to estimates on November 13, only 20 percent of the affected population in Tacloban was receiving aid. With a lack of access to clean water, some residents dug up water pipes and boiled water from there in order to survive. Thousands of people sought to evacuate the city via C-130 cargo planes, however, the slow process fueled further aggravation. Reports of escaped prisoners raping women in the city prompted a further urgency to evacuate. One resident was quoted as saying "Tacloban is a dead city." Due to the lack of electricity, planes could only operate during daylight, further slowing the evacuations. At dawn on November 12, thousands of people broke through fences and rushed towards planes only to be forced back by police and military personnel. A similar incident occurred later that day as a U.S. cargo plane was landing.

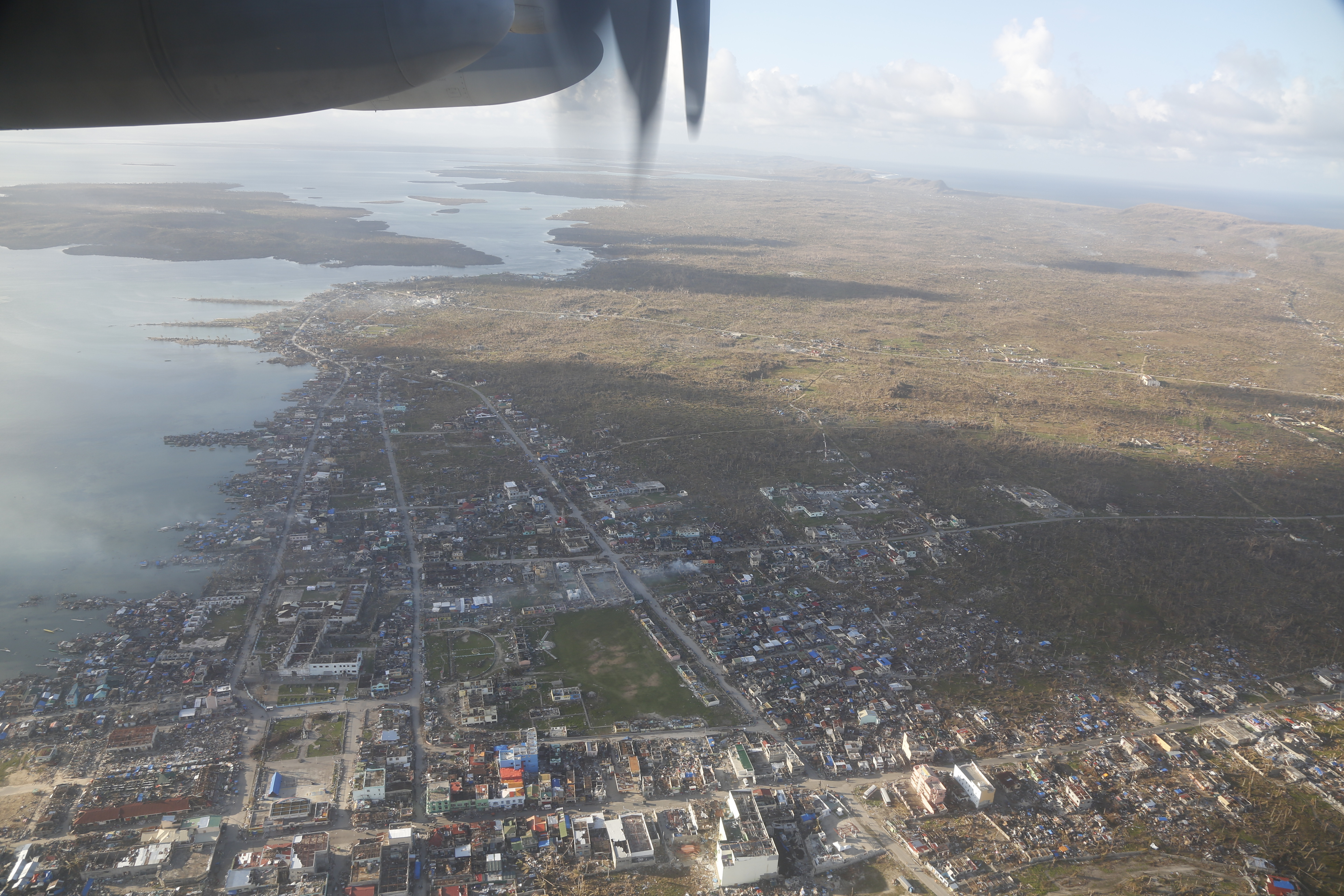
An aerial view of Guiuan, the town where the typhoon made its first landfall

On November 14, a correspondent from the BBC reported Tacloban to be a "war zone", although the situation soon stabilized when the presence of government law enforcement was increased. Safety concerns prompted several relief agencies to back out of the operation, and some United Nations staff were pulled out for safety reasons. A message circulating among the agencies urged them to not go into Tacloban for this reason. On the west coast of Leyte Island, residents in Ormoc were fearing that the focus on Tacloban would leave them without aid. Though not as hard hit, roughly 90 percent of the city was damaged or destroyed and supplies were running low. Hospitals in the city were either shut down or working at partial capacity, leaving many of the nearly 2,000 injured in the city without medical assistance. In nearby Baybay, the lack of assistance fueled anger and incited looting for survival. In the coastal community of Guiuan, which took the full brunt of the typhoon, Mayor Christopher Gonzalez is credited with saving countless lives after he incessantly urged residents to evacuate. He referred to the storm as "delubyo (deluge)", which roughly translates to Armageddon. Of the town's 45,000 residents, 87 died, 931 were injured, and 23 others were listed as missing. U.S. Navy Capt. Russell Hays, a medical officer, estimated that a storm of Haiyan's caliber could have killed as many as 4,500 in Guiuan alone had it not been for the mayor's efforts.

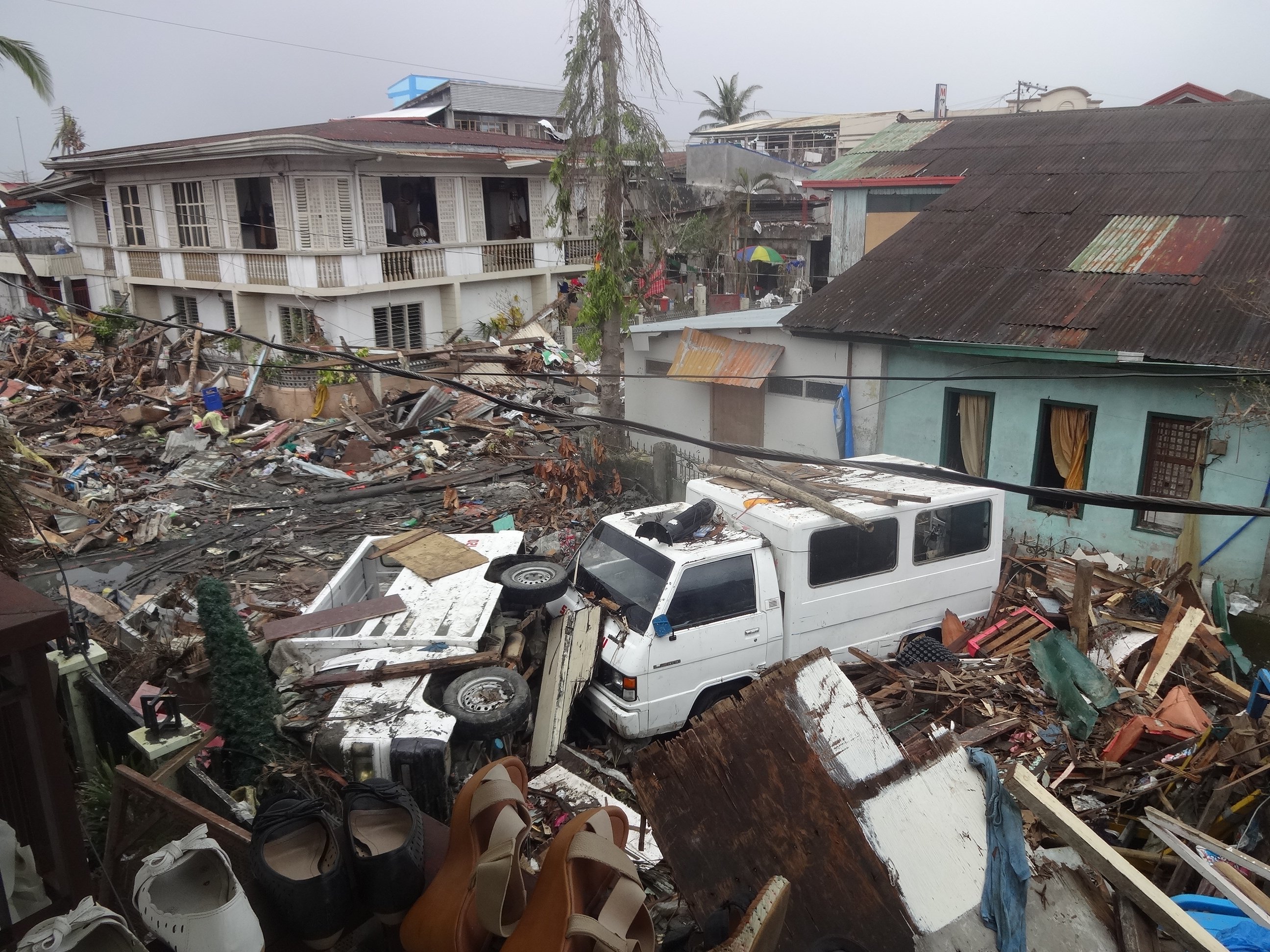
Destruction in Basey, Samar after the typhoon passed over the town

On November 18, the government of the Philippines launched an online portal, called the Foreign Aid Transparency Hub (FaiTH), that provides the public with a transparent view of the funds and other aid received by the government from the international community. To lead the management and rehabilitation efforts of the central provinces in the Philippines affected by Typhoon Haiyan, Philippines President Benigno Aquino III appointed Panfilo Lacson as Typhoon Haiyan Rehabilitation Czar.

During his presidency in mid-2017, Rodrigo Duterte created the IATF-Yolanda—an inter-agency task force to monitor and implement the government's rehabilitation programs in Haiyan-affected areas— later extending the agency's term until the end of his tenure. With the assistance of the agency, the National Housing Authority expedited the construction of housing units in the affected areas; around 148,000 of the 204,000 housing units for Haiyan survivors were completed by September 2021.

==== Environmental impact ====
Devastated coconut trees in Guiuan

Typhoon Haiyan knocked over Power Barge 103 of NAPOCOR in Estancia, Iloilo causing an oil spill. As a result of the typhoon, the government is planning to replant mangroves in coastal areas while preserving the remaining ones. Affected residents were allowed to return to their homes by the Department of Health on December 7, 2013, after an air quality test found that benzene levels in affected areas reached near-zero parts per million. Earlier, residents were asked to evacuate affected areas as the benzene levels had reached unhealthy amounts.

==== Looting and violence ====
Throughout Tacloban, widespread looting took place in the days following Haiyan's passage. In some instances, relief trucks were attacked and had food stolen in the city. Two of the city's malls and numerous grocery stores were subjected to looting. A fuel depot in the city was guarded by armed police while 200 additional officers were dispatched to assist. Security checkpoints had since been set up all over Tacloban and a curfew was imposed on residents to prevent more attacks. Philippine military forces also prevented members of the New People's Army from ambushing a relief convoy bound for Samar in Matnog, Sorsogon, killing two. President Benigno Aquino III considered declaring martial law in hopes of restoring order in affected areas.

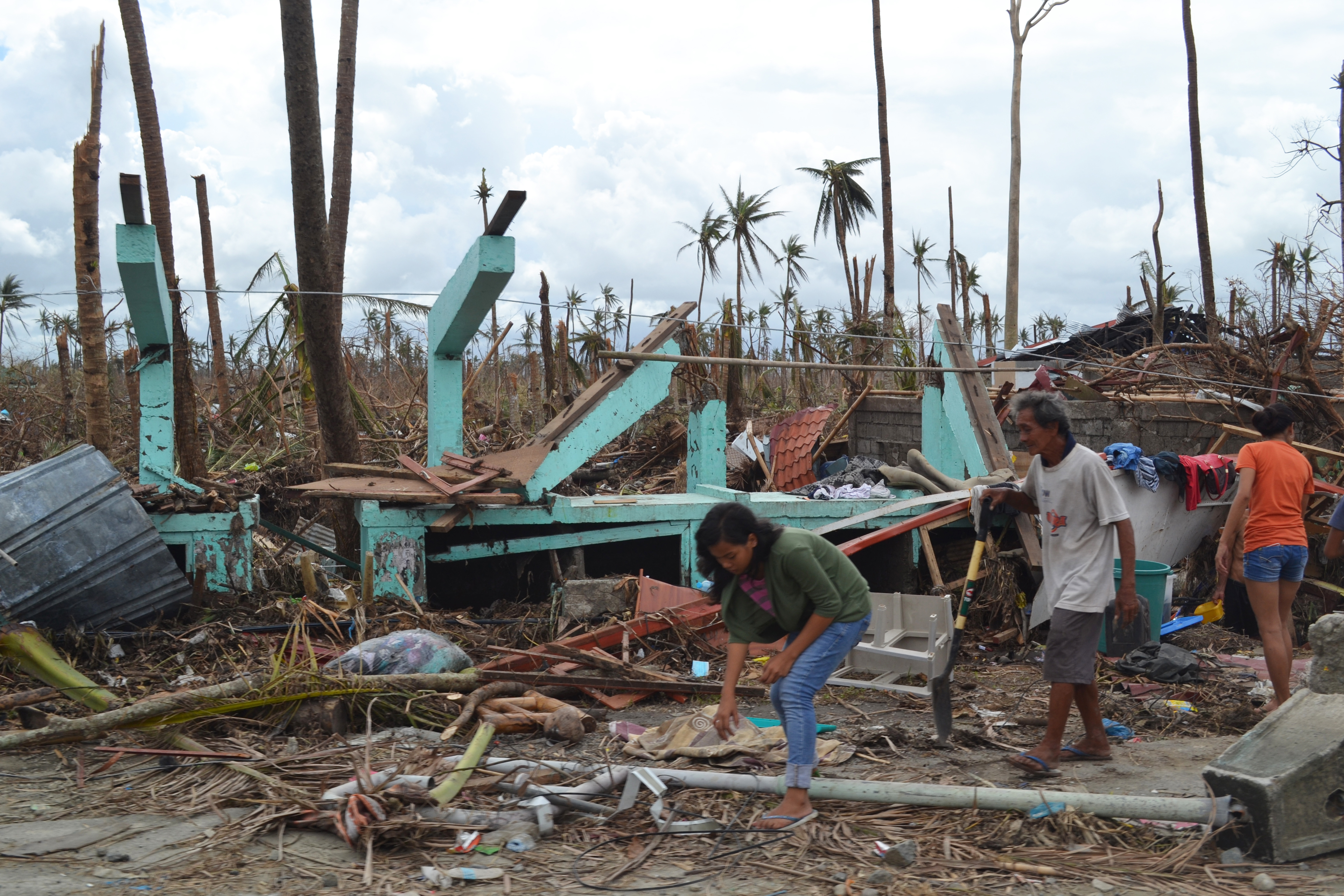
The remains of a home destroyed by the storm in Tacloban

Looting intensified as slow recovery efforts forced residents to seek any means necessary to survive. Tacloban city administrator Tecson John Lim stated, "The looting is not criminality. It is self-preservation." The Chicago Tribune reported that some areas were on the brink of anarchy, though Interior Secretary Mar Roxas denied such claims. Further complicating efforts to retain order was the lack of officers reporting for work. In Tacloban, only 100 of the city's 1,300 police personnel reported for duty. In Alangalang, just west of Tacloban, eight people were crushed to death after the walls of a warehouse collapsed during a raid on a government rice stockpile. Approximately 33,000 bags of rice, each weighing 50 kg (110 lb), were stolen. Warehouses were also raided in Jaro and Palo. Throughout Tacloban itself, people began looting from homes as stores had been completely emptied.

==== Criticism of government response ====
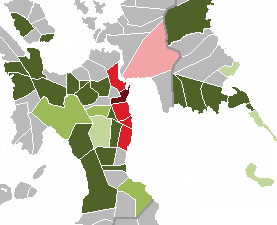
Color coded map of Eastern Visayas showing the number of deaths caused by Typhoon Haiyan. More than 1,000 500-999 100-499 50-99 25-49 1-24 0

Condemnations of slow government action in the relief effort in response to the typhoon mounted days after the storm had passed. Media reports criticized the Aquino administration for apparent lack of preparation and coordination among government agencies in the aid operation. Up until November 12, five days after the typhoon struck, survivors continued to struggle with basic necessities such as food, water, and shelter while remote towns in Leyte and Samar were yet to be reached by aid. The Philippine government responded by saying that they have dealt with the tragedy "quite well" but the response had been slow due to the breakdown of the local governance in affected areas where officials and employees, who were usually the first to respond in these events, were victims of the typhoon themselves. Cabinet Secretary Jose Rene Almendras said that the national government had to take over despite logistical challenges and assured it was working toward providing aid in the quickest way possible to the survivors. The national Government was also criticized for putting the responsibility of handling the dead to the Bureau of Fire Protection instead to the Department of Health. Dr. Raquel Fortun, one of the forensic experts to go to the area three days after the typhoon insisted that handling of the bodies is a health matter and therefore a responsibility of DOH. Then mayor of Davao City, Rodrigo Duterte, who visited Tacloban, said dead bodies lay unattended for four days after Haiyan ravaged the city; tearily, he remarked "God must have been somewhere else" and said declaring a state of calamity was not sufficient.

One of the biggest controversies of Typhoon Haiyan is probably the number of victims or the body count. According to the Philippine government sources, the number of those killed during the typhoon ranges from 4,000 to 6,000 individuals while some sources claim that the body count reaches up to 15,000. Rejecting the estimate death toll of at least 10,000, Aquino gave his own estimate at 2,000 to 5,000 three days after Haiyan struck.

The Aquino administration was also criticized for its inefficient distribution of funds and several government officials were accused of embezzling the money allotted for the typhoon victims. Aquino's FAiTH online portal did not track foreign aid coursed through local government units and private organizations. Mar Roxas, who served as Interior Secretary during the typhoon, likewise received criticism for his perceived silence on how the typhoon funds were spent. As President Aquino III stepped down from office in June 2016, his administration failed to release ₱20 billion housing assistance funds for the typhoon victims.

The succeeding Duterte administration expressed dismay at the delays and backlogs in the government's housing program; some Haiyan survivors called on the administration to demolish substandard units and to probe deeper into the anomalies surrounding the resettlement projects. In 2018, coinciding with the fifth year mark of the disaster, the survivors again protested against the government's slow response on rehabilitation efforts, displaying the caricature of President Rodrigo Duterte, who was the Mayor of Davao City at the time of the disaster. In November 2018, the National Economic and Development Authority confirmed that the budget is under the 2016 "Yolanda" Recovery & Reconstruction Program that "remained untapped & were not released" until the expiration of the validity of the funds last December 31, 2017, during President Duterte's second year in office; an environmental group criticized the Duterte administration's decision to divert ₱5 billion funds for Haiyan housing to rebuild war-torn Marawi.

==== Humanitarian crisis and population displacement ====
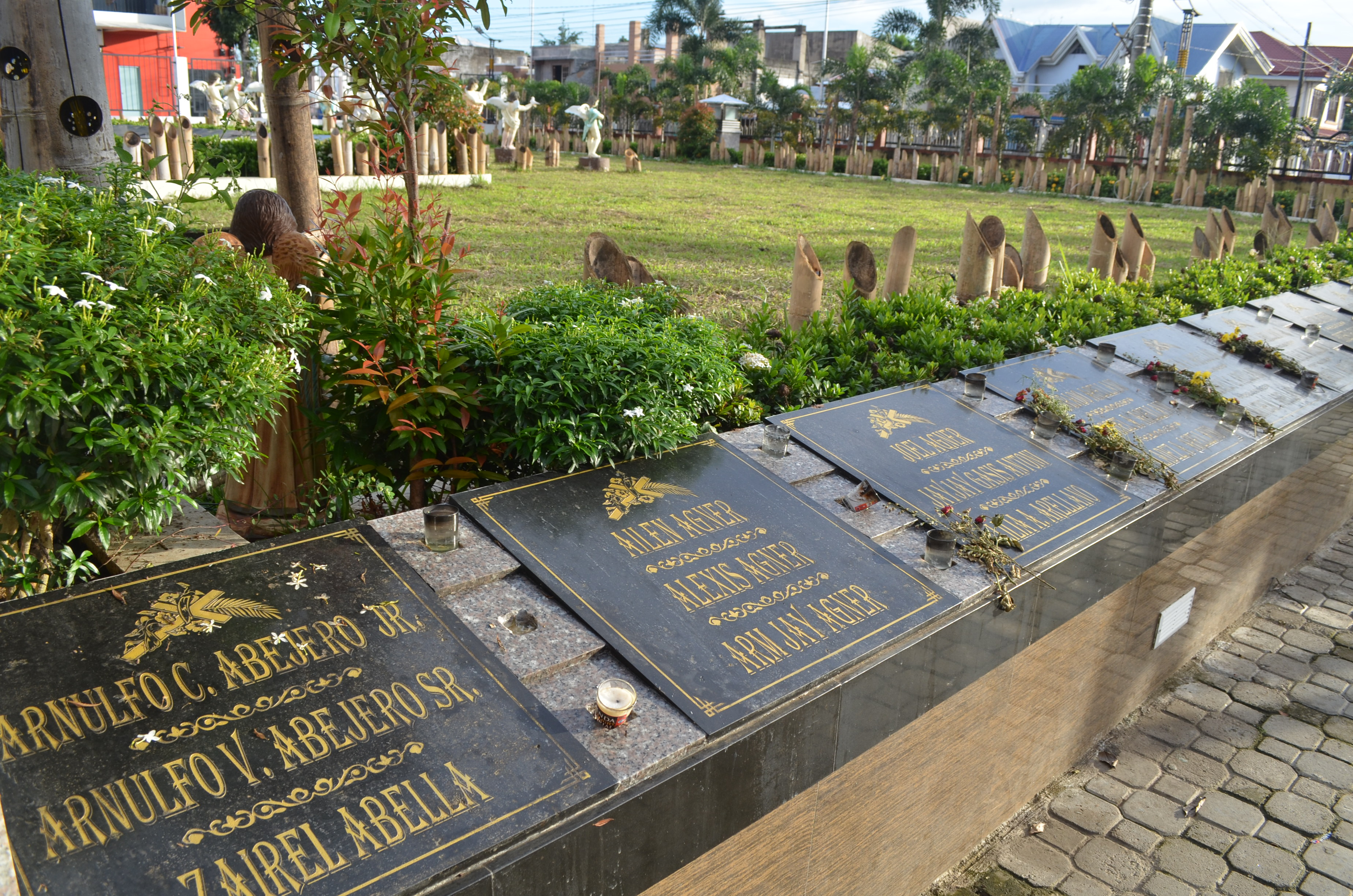
Mass graves of typhoon victims within the Palo Cathedral grounds

The Philippines faced a humanitarian crisis days after the typhoon hit much of the Visayas with 1.8 million homeless and more than 6,000,000 displaced. In Tacloban alone, ninety percent of the structures are either destroyed or damaged while other cities, such as Ormoc, are reporting similar damage. The United Nations fears that the possibility of the spread of disease is high due to the lack of food, water, shelter, and medication. Casualties have been reported as a result of the lack of aid in affected areas and the number of dead is likely to rise.

As a result of the damage in Tacloban and much of Leyte, thousands of people who once lived in the area left and made their way into less affected areas such as Cebu and Manila. Catbalogan reported that their population more than doubled after the typhoon with the influx of refugees into the city. Around 20,000 people have fled to Manila as a result of the storm.

Typhoon Haiyan has been acknowledged as a sort of "trauma milestone" for mental health awareness in the Philippines – where Filipinos had previously seen counseling as an admission of weakness, it began to be acknowledged as "a sign of how extraordinary the circumstances are."

==== International response ====
Summary of international relief efforts in the Philippines following Typhoon Haiyan
Country	Cash donation (in US dollars)	Humanitarian aid and supplies	Other aid	Source
Australia	$70 million	Emergency and humanitarian supplies.	Royal Australian Air Force and Royal Australian Navy's HMAS Tobruk deployed with Australian Medical Assistance Team and supplies.	
Bahrain		90 tons of relief supplies.		
Bangladesh	$1 million			
Belgium	$677,000	Humanitarian aid.	Field hospital, water purification system, 5 medical doctors, 13 nurses, and 10 logistic personnel.	
Brunei		Humanitarian aid and relief supplies.	Emergency team deployed. Aircraft from the Royal Brunei Air Force deployed with supplies.	
Canada	$40 million	Humanitarian aid; water purification units; infrastructure repair teams; medical units	Three hundred members of the Canadian military Disaster Assistance Response Team (DART) and their equipment are sent, along with three additional Griffon helicopters. Canadian Medical Assistance Team deployed several mobile primary medical teams, to assist under-serviced rural and remote communities in northern Cebu, and western and central Leyte. GlobalMedic, a Toronto-based NGO has three teams of rescuers and medics dispatched to the disaster zone along with large quantities of water purification supplies and equipment.	
Chile		Humanitarian aid.		
China	$1.4 million		Deployed the naval hospital ship, Peace Ark.	
Denmark	$7.8 million	Humanitarian aid.	Provided UN with the emergency response base camp and infrastructure to facilitate the rapid humanitarian relief efforts.	
Finland	$2.2 million		Three disaster relief experts sent to Tacloban	
France	$1.4 million		Sent 70 tons of relief supplies and a team of 61 persons from the Sécurité Civile, to restore electricity and water supplies, and others.	
Germany		23 tons of aid.	Rescue teams sent.	
Holy See	$150,000			
Hong Kong			Call to postpone economic sanctions. $5.16 million given to international charities.	
Iceland	$100,000			
India		15 tonnes of relief supplies.		
Indonesia	$1 million	Humanitarian aid of goods and logistics worth $1 million. Indonesian Red Cross sent 688,862 tonnes emergency supplies.	Three Indonesian Air Force Hercules aircraft deployed with supplies to affected areas. Logistical aid including aircraft, food, generators and medicine. The Indonesian Red Cross deployed KM Emir cargo ship loaded with emergency supplies and also 30 Indonesian Red Cross volunteers.	
Ireland	$1.36 million	100 tonnes of emergency supplies.		
Israel			Sent members of the Israeli Foreign Ministry and the Israeli Defense Forces' Home Command.	
Italy	$1.36 million			
Japan	$52 million	Humanitarian aid.	Deployed the JDS Ise (DDH-182) and JDS Ōsumi (LST-4001) and Boeing KC-767 and C-130J Hercules along with 1,180 members of the Japanese Self-Defense Forces.The Japan Disaster Relief team was also deployed.	
Kuwait	$10 million			
Malaysia	$1 million	Essential relief supplies and humanitarian aid. Malaysian Filipino community collected supplies to be sent.	Aircraft from the Royal Malaysian Air Force deployed with supplies. The Malaysian disaster relief team was also deployed.	
Mexico	$1 million			
New Zealand	$1.22 million	30 tonnes of food and medical supplies.		
Norway	$41.6 million	100 tonnes of food and 70 tonnes of communication equipment.	In addition to the aid provided by the Norwegian government, Norwegians supported various aid agencies, such as the Norwegian Red Cross and the Norwegian branch of Save the Children, with donations through texting reaching 30 million NOK (US$4.9 million). On October 24, a relief concert with various Norwegian artists was held in Norway for the victims of the typhoon in the Philippines. During the 70-minute TV broadcast, Norwegians donated another 24.7 million NOK (US$4 million).	
Qatar		80 tonnes of relief supplies.		
Saudi Arabia	$10 million	Relief supplies.	Saudi Prince Talal bin Abdul Aziz pledged $100,000 in behalf of the Arab Gulf Program for Development (AGFUND).	
Singapore	$276,000	Humanitarian aid.	Aircraft from the Republic of Singapore Air Force deployed with supplies.	
South Africa		Rescue South Africa Disaster Response Team sent.	The 50 man trauma/rescue team treated patients and repaired the Abuyog District Hospital.	
South Korea	$25 million	Humanitarian aid including Humanitarian teams and Relief goods(family tents, water purifiers, beef fried rice, blankets, and sanitation kits) turned over to DSWD.	Deployed Emergency relief team (two batches of medical and rescue personnel, 17-man survey team). Pledged USD 5M worth of assistance and US$20M ODA for construction and rehabilitation from 2014 to 2016. Deployed 2 C-130 planes, Bi Ro Bong LST and Sung In Bong LST for humanitarian transport along with 520 members of the Republic of Korea Army.	
Spain	$1.8 million		The Spanish government also chartered two flights that brought 35 tons of humanitarian aid to the disaster area.	
Sweden	$1.5 million		The Swedish Civil Contingencies Agency (MSB) sent tents, telecommunications equipment and other supplies	
Switzerland	$5.4 million	21 tons of Emergency Assistance.	Members of Swiss Humanitarian Aid Unit sent.	
Taiwan	$200,000	680 tons of relief supplies. Estimated total amount of donated relief materials and money reached US$12.3 million as of mid-December. Taiwan, by Navy and Air Force, is the first country delivering relief supplies to Philippines.	A 35-person team organized by the Taiwan Root Medical Peace Corps arrived in the affected areas to provide free medical assistance. Aircraft from the Republic of China Air Force and Republic of China Navy vessel deployed with supplies.	
Thailand		Humanitarian aid.		
Turkey		Humanitarian supplies.		
United Arab Emirates	$10 million			
United Kingdom	$131 million		Deployed HMS Daring and HMS Illustrious and Royal Air Force C-130J – stationed in Cebu delivering over 235,000 of aid – and Royal Air Force Boeing C-17 Globemaster III for Humanitarian Aid and Relief (HADR) efforts.	
United States	$86.7 million	Deployed the USS George Washington (CVN-73) and her embarked carrier strike group, along with the 31st Marine Expeditionary Unit, embarked aboard the USS Ashland and USS Germantown, of Amphibious Squadron 11. At its peak, the U.S. military efforts included more than 13,400 military personnel from the US Marine Corps, US Navy and US Air Force. 66 aircraft were involved in the mission including the fixed-wing C17 Globemaster, C-130 Hercules and MV-22 Osprey of the 3rd Marine Expeditionary Brigade, as well as MH-60 Seahawk helicopters. 12 U.S. Navy vessels responded in all. The US also deployed the United States Agency for International Development and Office of Foreign Disaster Assistance crisis response teams to oversee military operations, and coordinate the US government response with the government of the Philippines.		
Vietnam	$100,000			

==== Supranational bodies ====
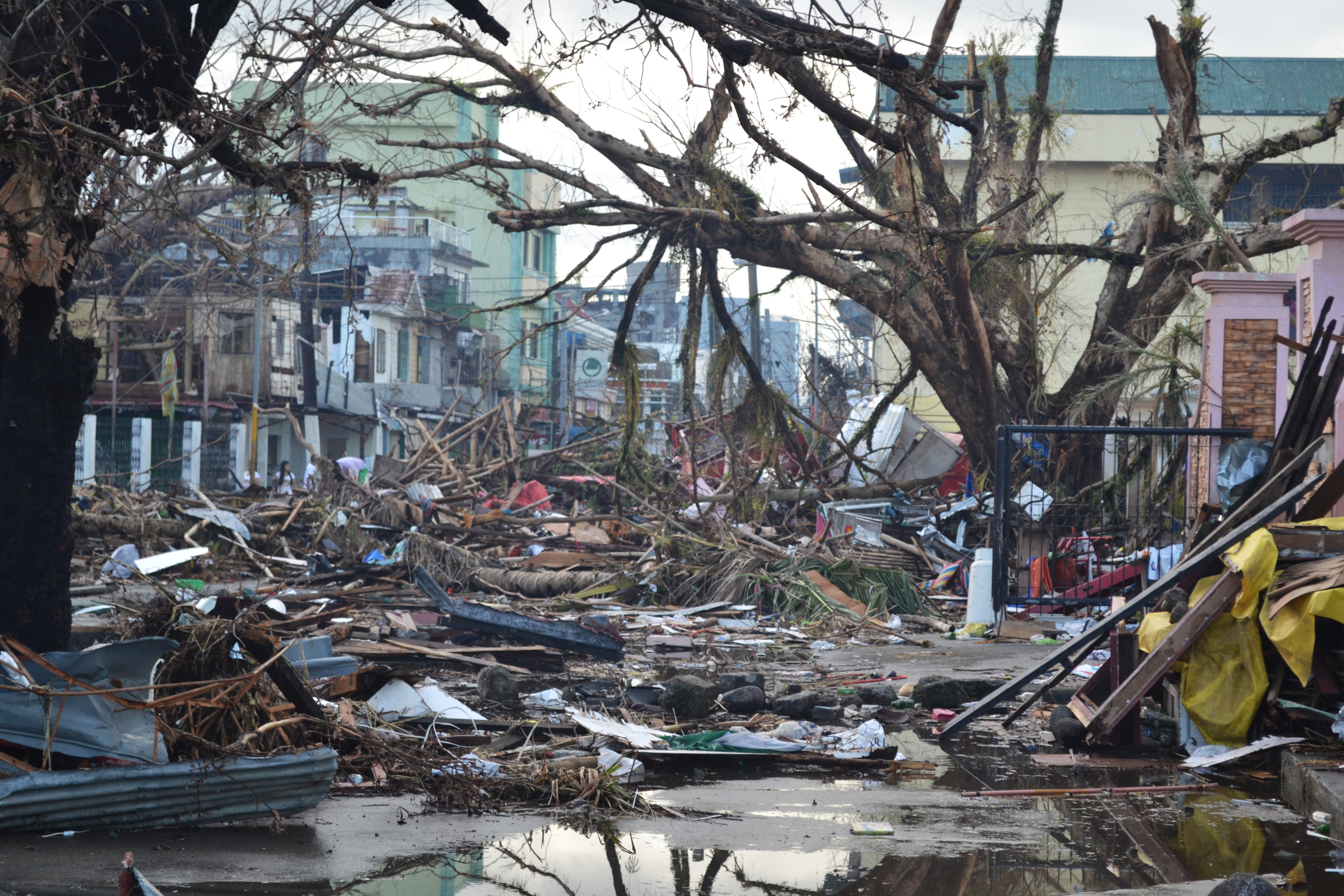
Debris littering the streets of Tacloban on November 14, nearly a week after the storm struck

The United Nations said it was going to increase critical relief operations as a result of the devastation caused by the typhoon. Its Manila office issued a statement that read, "Access remains a key challenge as some areas are still cut off from relief operations. Unknown numbers of survivors do not have basic necessities such as food, water, and medicines and remain inaccessible for relief operations, as roads, airports, and bridges were destroyed or covered in wreckage." The United Nations also began relief operations by this time; however, the severe damage to infrastructure hampered efforts to distribute supplies. The UN activated the Cluster System, in which groups of humanitarian organizations (UN and non-UN) work to restore health, shelter, nutrition and economic activity.

The World Health Organization, which leads the Health Cluster, the largest one, has developed guidance on donations of medicine and healthcare equipment so that the Philippines receives supplies appropriate for this emergency. According to WHO, many people suffered cuts, wounds, and broken bones during the disaster and others were injured in flooding that followed the typhoon. Interpol announced that they would send in Interpol officers from Lyon to help local law enforcement identify any of the corpses that are unidentified.

The World Health Organization has spearheaded initiatives among help workers, especially from the Department of Health (Philippines), in extending Psychological First Aid to people in typhoon-affected areas. WHO Representative in the country Dr Julie Hall foresees long-lasting effects from the typhoon. She calls for increased preparedness to give support to families and communities for the long-term, citing the need for more trained field workers.

==== Celebrities, companies, and NGOs ====
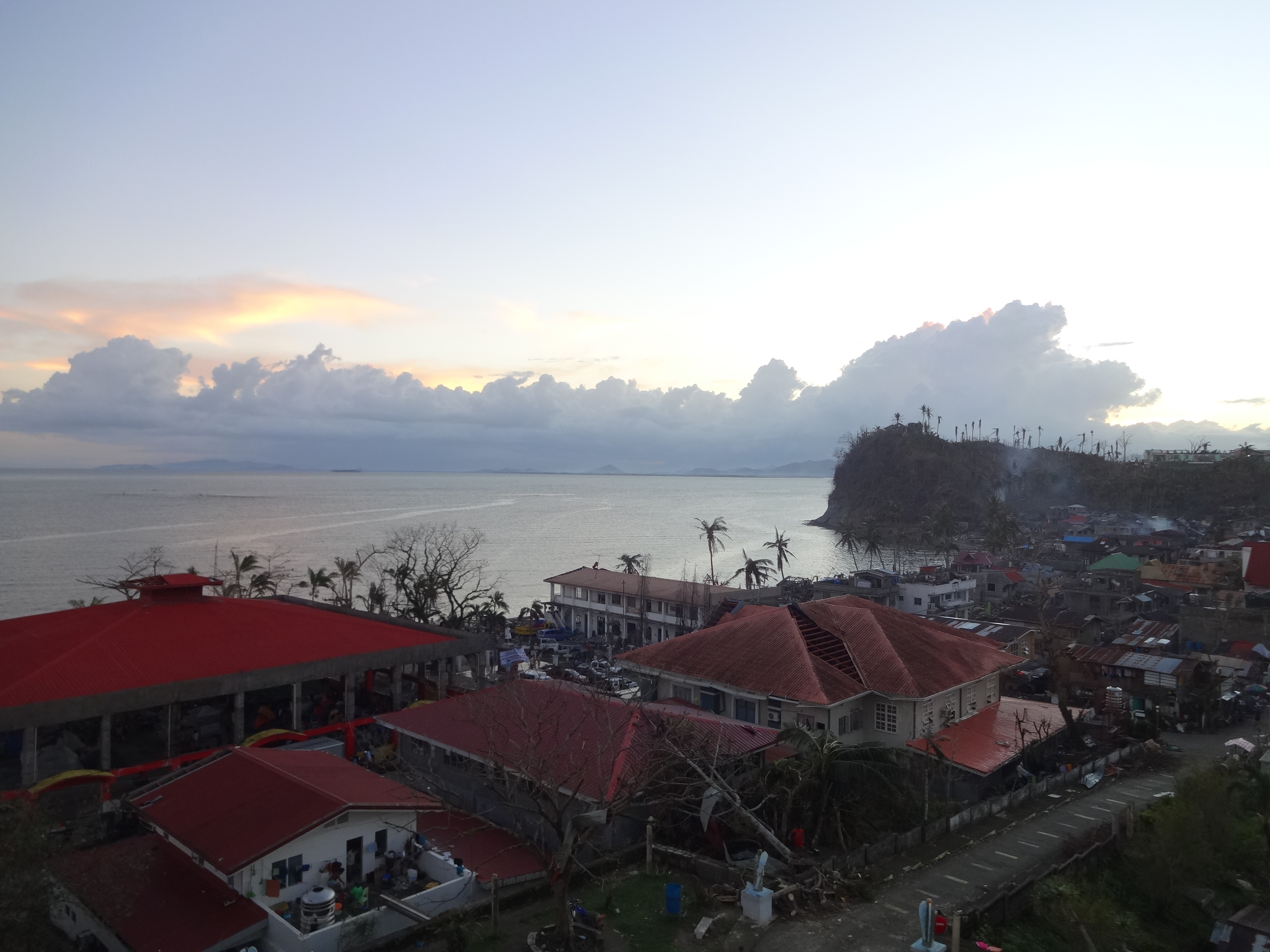
Devastation in the town of Basey, Samar, where more than 300 individuals perished due to storm surge

American band Journey donated $350,000 to help relief efforts in the Philippines, and its lead singer had a message for his homeland: "Don't Stop Believin'". Arnel Pineda (the band's Filipino vocalist) and the rest of the band announced the donation on November 15, 2013. It will go to the United Nations World Food Programme, which is providing Filipinos with food assistance. The donation should provide 1.4 million meals. IKEA, Walmart, Samsung, and HSBC are among those taking advantage of the event to donate to those in need. Northwestern Mutual announced they will donate $100,000 to the American Red Cross. The Coca-Cola Company says they have donated $2.5 million of their advertising budget to the relief efforts as of November 25. By mid-December, FIFA donated $1 million. DHL deployed its Asia Pacific Disaster Response Team to the disaster areas to provide on-the-ground logistics support to assist with the relief effort in the aftermath of the devastating Typhoon Haiyan. Three rotating teams made up of volunteer employees from the Asia Pacific region were based at the Mactan Cebu Airport on Cebu island, providing support and assistance to the country's most affected areas west of Leyte Island, including Guiuan, Roxas, and Tacloban. Many smaller initiatives were founded as well – e.g. to prepare by donating to children a typhoon-ready backpack as a floating device. Medical Doctors in global health like Edmond Fernandes who worked in the service of the people of Philippines recalled that broken hearts and shattered dreams existed everywhere with widespread devastation.

Sixteen-time NBA Champions Los Angeles Lakers donated $150,000 to the Philippine Red Cross to aid the typhoon-affected victims. During their home game against the Memphis Grizzlies, Kobe Bryant handed the check to the Junior NBA players representing the Philippines. His teammate, Pau Gasol, pledged to donate $1,000 per point to UNICEF with the directive to help victims of Super Typhoon Haiyan in the country as well. He scored 24 points in a won game against the Golden State Warriors. Major League Baseball donated $200,000 to UNICEF and the American Red Cross, with Commissioner Bud Selig encouraging fans to donate to the organizations. UNICEF delivered portable toilets and hygiene supplies to the region and also appealed for $34 million to help the four million children affected. The American Red Cross announced that they collected $11 million in donations for the Philippines Relief Fund. Mercy Corps dispatched an "emergency response" team to help with humanitarian efforts. MAP International launched medical relief efforts providing over $10 million in medicines and supplies to the Philippines.

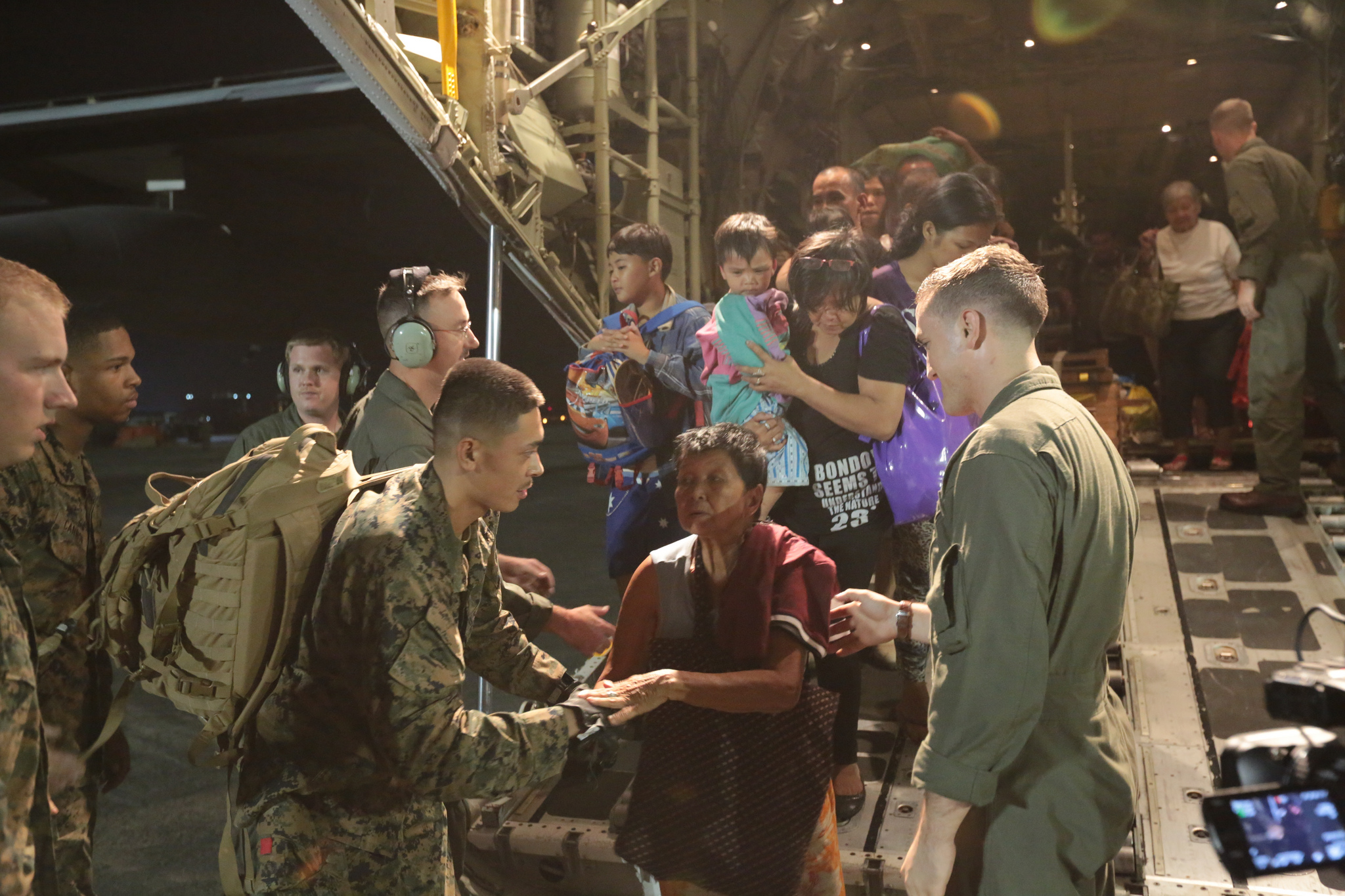
U.S. Marines assisting in the Philippine disaster relief

Among the NGO responses, among the most comprehensive disaster response came from the Taiwan-based "Buddhist Tzu Chi Foundation". Archived from the original on November 29, 2014., which organized a large-scale cash-for-work program in Tacloban from Nov 20 to Dec 8 with up to 31,000 participants per day, totaling nearly 300,000-day shifts. This operation not only helped clean out the thousands of tons of debris covering the city, but also kicked-started the local economy. Tzu Chi also contributed emergency cash aid of 8000, 12000 or 15000 pesos depending on family size for over 60,000 families in the affected areas of Tacloban, Ormoc, Palo, Tanauan and Tunga, and has been providing free clinics, hot meals, and temporary classrooms for over 15 schools in the area. Doctors Without Borders is sending 200 tons of aid. The International Society for Krishna Consciousness's Food For Life Global, the world's largest vegan food relief organisation, raised money and provided vegan meals in the Philippines to Typhoon Haiyan survivors. Other NGOs run by faith-based organisations that raised money and/or aided in the disaster relief efforts of Typhoon Haiyan included Catholic Relief Services, Catholic Medical Mission Board (CMMB), Adventist Development and Relief Agency (ADRA), LDS Philanthropies, American Jewish Joint Distribution Committee (AJJDC), Samaritan's Purse, Salvation Army, Christian Children's Fund of Canada, MAP International and World Vision. International Responders for Emergencies and Disasters endured the storm and despite losing equipment and personnel, they contributed to over $100,000 in aid and supplied rescuer workers for 3 months.

The Iglesia ni Cristo (INC), the largest indigenous Christian church based in the Philippines held a series of massive relief distributions and medical and dental missions to affected populations of the storm to different parts of Visayas. The humanitarian mission was done under the "Lingap sa Mamamayan" (Aid for Humanity) project in cooperation with the Felix Y. Manalo (FYM) Foundation Inc., the INC's charitable arm. The church conducted the largest walk for a cause in the world (walkathon) on February 15, 2014, dubbed as 'Iglesia ni Cristo World Wide Walk for Those Affected by Typhoon Yolanda/Haiyan'. The walk for a cause raised millions of money to help the victims of the super typhoon for the construction of their houses and shelters. The aim of the activity is to make the world understand that Haiyan survivors are still in dire need of help and financial assistance. Indeed, the worldwide walk caught the attention of the world when it broke two Guinness world records as the largest charity walk in a single venue (Manila, Philippines) with 175,000 participants, and largest charity walk in 24 hours for multiple venues (from Christchurch, New Zealand to Hawaii, USA) in 13 time zones, 54 countries, 24 hours with 519,521 participants.

Celebrities such as David and Victoria Beckham, Stephen Colbert, Kim Kardashian, David Guetta, and The X Factor contributed to the fundraising. On November 26, iTunes released a compilation album entitled Songs for the Philippines featuring different artists, including Katy Perry, Madonna, Bob Dylan, and The Beatles. All proceeds will go to the Philippine Red Cross. OneRepublic donated $100,000 on November 30, 2013. Other celebrities that offered their support included Linkin Park, The Offspring, Alicia Keys, and Justin Bieber. To promote 20th Century Fox's upcoming film The Secret Life of Walter Mitty, the studio hired YouTube personality & filmmaker Casey Neistat to make a promotional video based on the theme, "live your dreams", but Neistat suggested instead to spend the budget on bringing disaster relief to the Philippines. Fox agreed and gave him a budget of $25,000 to fund his relief plans, and personally visited Tacloban to aid donation efforts there. On the day of his death, actor Paul Walker attended a charity event for his organization, Reach Out Worldwide, for the victims of the typhoon that was held right before his accident.

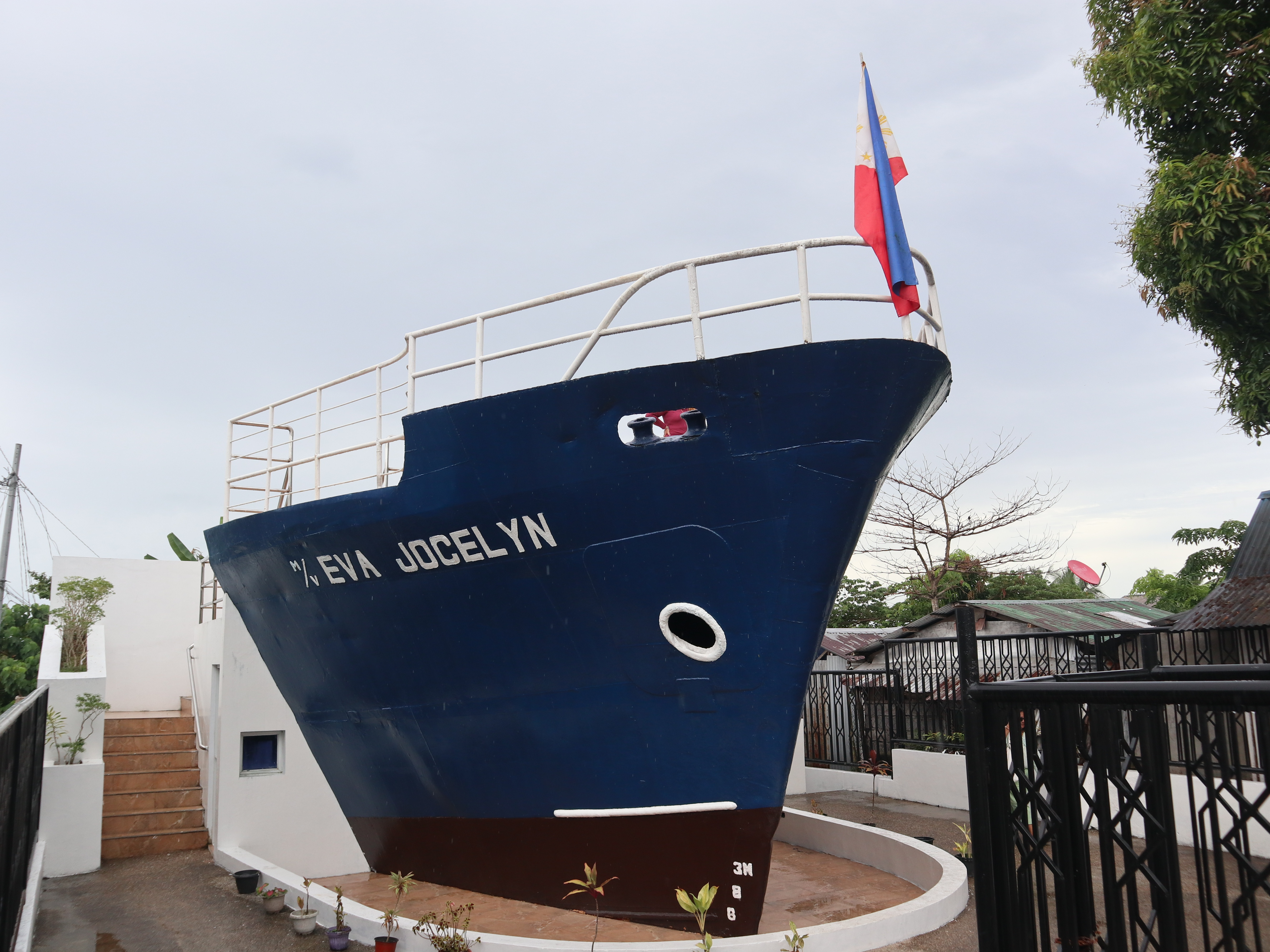
MV Eva Jocelyn memorial park in 2023

On March 11, 2014, a benefit concert called The Pinoy Relief Benefit Concert was held at Madison Square Garden in New York, City. Jennifer Hudson, Pentatonix, A Great Big World, Plain White T's, Jessica Sanchez, Charice, and REO Brothers performed. Special guests also included Dr. Oz, Dante Basco, Bobby Lopez, Kristen Anderson-Lopez and Apl.de.ap. 100% of proceeds raised directly went to the Typhoon Haiyan survivors. Pinoy Relief was created to help survivors and focus on three specific areas: restoring livelihoods, building classrooms and providing shelter in partnership with local NGOs, Habitat for Humanity Philippines and Operation Blessing Philippines. On March 13, 2016, former US vice president Al Gore, visited Tacloban and delivered his speech in front of the survivors of Haiyan. He also visited the MV Eva Jocelyn, a cargo ship forced inland during the typhoon and now converted into a memorial park.

===== Politics involving aid relief =====
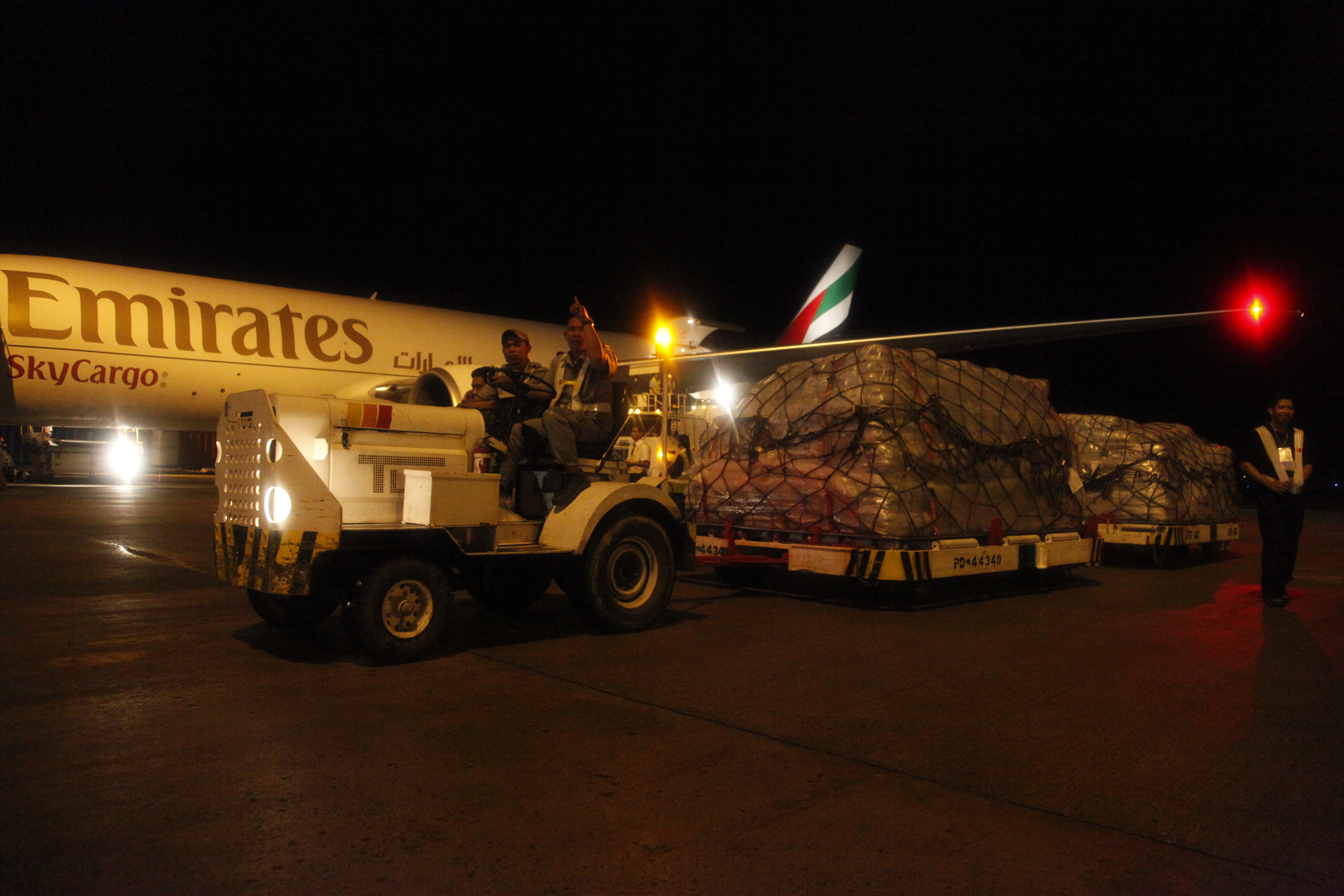
First UK-funded humanitarian flight arrives at Mactan–Cebu International Airport.

Media reports initially noted the disparate aid responses by the United States and China against the backdrop of rising tensions between the Philippines and China over the two countries' competing territorial claims in the South China Sea. Fox News initially criticized China for its contribution of US$100,000 cash each from the government and the Chinese Red Cross to the typhoon victims, which led to commentary about its disputes with the Philippines. Earlier in 2013, the Philippines sued China over the nine-dash line. Western commentators attributed this low amount to China's intentions to isolate the Philippines while strengthening its ties with the rest of Southeast Asia. The move elicited mixed reactions from the Chinese public and government with some commending its decision while others, such as Global Times, a tabloid newspaper of the Chinese Communist Party, insisted that China should behave like a responsible power. China later increased its contributions by US$1.64 million and sent its naval hospital ship Peace Ark for disaster relief.

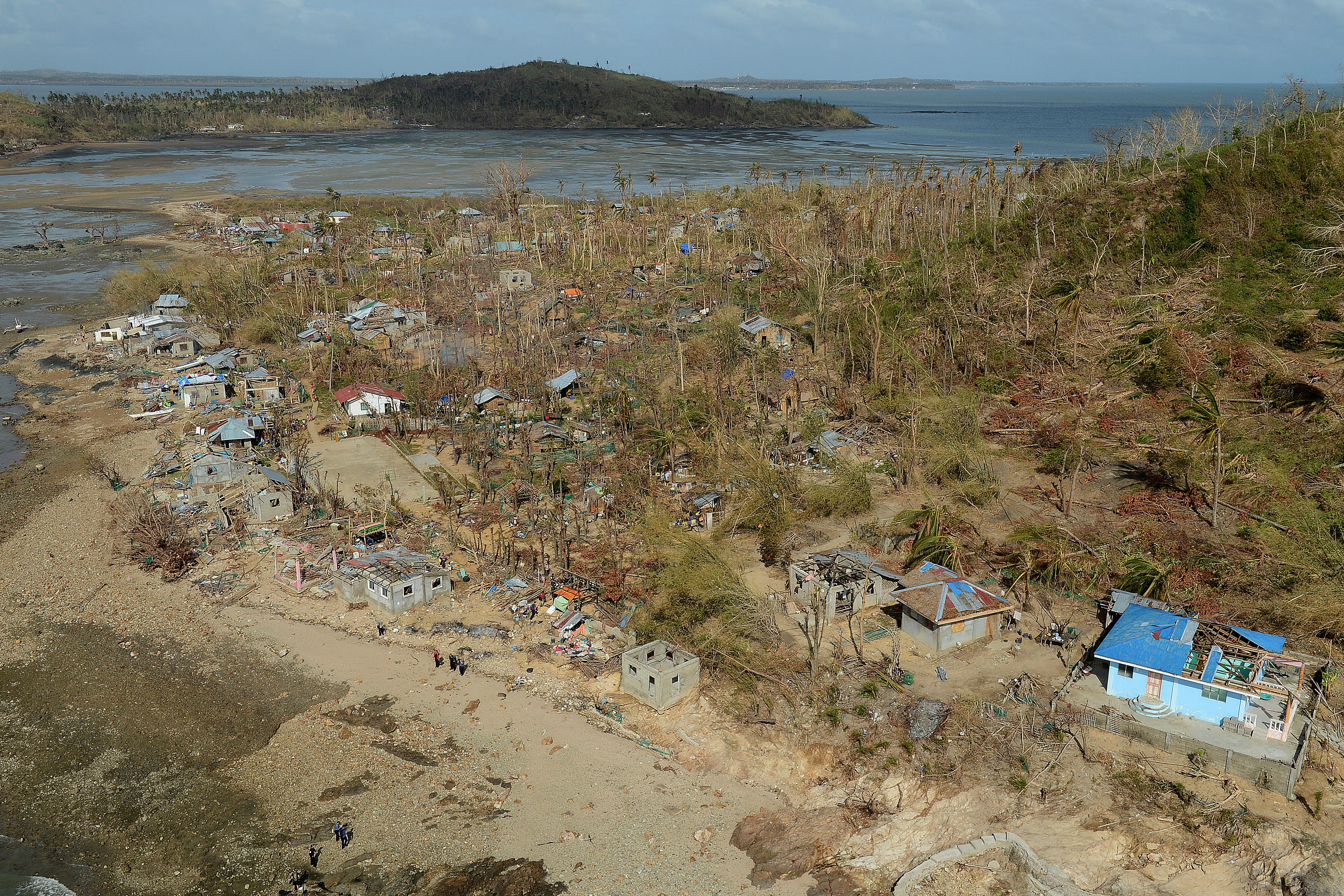
The island of Binuluanguan overflown by a helicopter from HMS Daring

As part of its relief operations named "Operation Damayan", the United States gave the Philippines aid worth US$51.9 million and deployed the United States Marines, United States Navy and United States Air Force to assist with the humanitarian operations. Amidst territorial disputes with China in the South China Sea, the Philippine government under the Aquino III administration saw the U.S. typhoon military assistance as an opportunity to allow deployment of U.S. military troops within the country. A few months later, the Aquino administration signed with U.S. Ambassador to the Philippines Philip Goldberg a 10-year Enhanced Defense Cooperation Agreement, a gift to U.S. President Barack Obama. An article in the journal Social Medicine said this was part of the "Asia pivot" that the United States government had previously announced, a foreign policy strategy it viewed as a plan to contain China, encircle it militarily, and prevent it from competing with American political influence in the region.

=== Vietnam ===
Following Typhoon Haiyan's landfall in Vietnam, widespread search and rescue missions took place in the affected provinces. Damage assessments were also conducted in 13 provinces to determine what aid was needed. The IFRC began distribution of relief supplies and assisted residents in returning home by November 12. Operations regarding the aftermath of Typhoon Wutip were temporarily suspended due to Haiyan.

=== Climate change ===
Political leaders and climate scientists connected the typhoon to climate change, both at the time and subsequently and led to calls for climate justice. The 2013 United Nations Climate Change Conference was coincidentally in progress when the typhoon struck and Yeb Saño, the lead negotiator of the Philippines delegation, received a standing ovation at the conference when he declared a hunger strike.

In solidarity with my countrymen who are struggling to find food back home, I will now commence a voluntary fasting for the climate; this means I will voluntarily refrain from eating food during this COP, until a meaningful outcome is in sight.

— Yeb Saño

Several delegates, including American delegate Collin Reese, joined him in fasting. Sixty people from Climate Action Network, an umbrella group of environmental non-governmental organisations, also joined the hunger strike.

The correlation between the increasing intensity of storms and the progression of climate change was discussed by climate scientists. "Typhoons, hurricanes and all tropical storms draw their vast energy from the warmth of the sea. We know sea-surface temperatures are warming pretty much around the planet, so that's a pretty direct influence of climate change on the nature of the storm", said Will Steffen, director of the Australian National University climate change institute. Myles Allen, head of the climate dynamics group at the University of Oxford, said that "The current consensus is that climate change is not making the risk of hurricanes any greater, but there are physical arguments and evidence that there is a risk of more intense hurricanes." The Huffington Post made the point that the 70% deforestation of the Philippines since 1900, as reported by the national Forest Management Bureau, made far more lethal flooding from cyclones like Haiyan more likely. The IPCC Fifth Assessment Report had stated in September of the same year that "Time series of cyclone indices such as power dissipation, an aggregate compound of tropical cyclone frequency, duration, and intensity that measures total wind energy by tropical cyclones, show upward trends in the North Atlantic and weaker upward trends in the western North Pacific since the late 1970s."

== In popular media ==
A detailed analysis of Typhoon Haiyan and its destruction in the Philippines was featured in a documentary called Megastorm: World's Biggest Typhoon. It aired on December 30, 2013, on Discovery Channel.

An episode of the PBS science documentary television program Nova titled "Killer Typhoon", aired on January 22, 2014, features the typhoon.

In 2014, Hong Kong RTHK TV program Meterorology Series IV Episode 1 Typhoon is coming is broadcast Typhoon Haiyan in Tacloban.

The 2014 documentary Six Hours: Surviving Typhoon Yolanda, produced by Big Monster Entertainment and distributed by GRB Entertainment, also features the eyewitness account of the typhoon by GMA News reporter (now Frontline Pilipinas and Agripreneur host) Jiggy Manicad. The documentary also gives permission to Marnie Manicad Productions Inc.

The 2015 drama film Taklob, directed by Brillante Mendoza features the survivors in the aftermath of the typhoon.

In 2021, a drama related to Typhoon Haiyan titled Kun Maupay Man It Panahon (lit. 'Whether the weather is fine') which is directed by Carlo Francisco Manatad which aired on August 9, 2021.

== See also ==
- Typhoons in the Philippines
- Other most intense tropical cyclones
- List of tropical cyclone records
