= Meteorological history of Typhoon Haiyan =

Typhoon Haiyan (Yolanda)
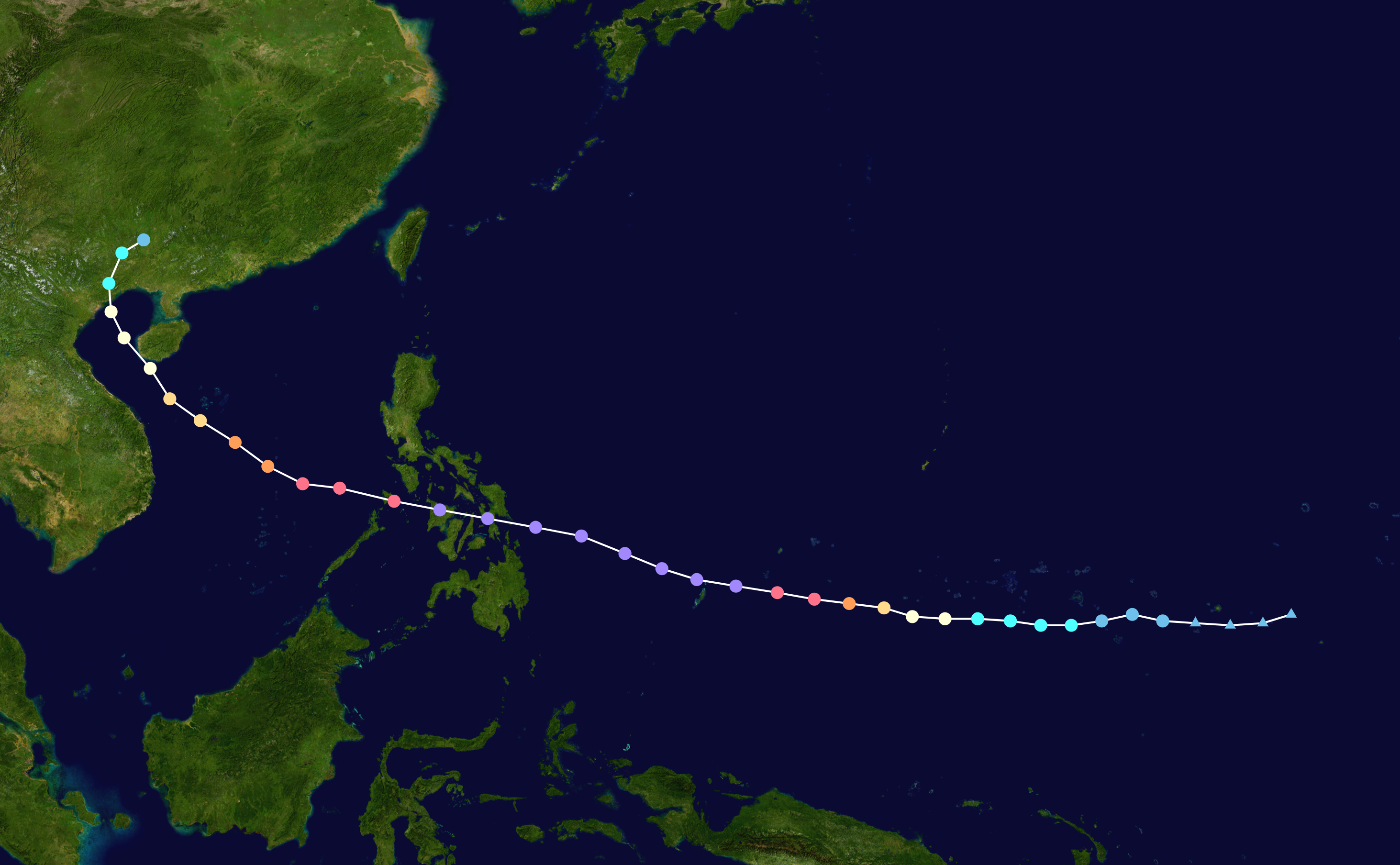
- Track of Typhoon Haiyan (Yolanda)

Meteorological history
- Formed: November 3, 2013
- Dissipated: November 11, 2013

Violent typhoon
- 10-minute sustained (JMA)
- Highest winds: 230 km/h (145 mph)
- Lowest pressure: 895 hPa (mbar); 26.43 inHg

Category 5-equivalent super typhoon
- 1-minute sustained (SSHWS/JTWC)
- Highest winds: 315 km/h (195 mph)
- Lowest pressure: 895 hPa (mbar); 26.43 inHg

Overall effects
- Areas affected: Micronesia; Palau; Philippines; South China; Vietnam
- Part of the 2013 Pacific typhoon season
- History: Meteorological history; Response: Humanitarian response; Other wikis: Commons: Haiyan images

Typhoon Haiyan's meteorological history began with its origins as a tropical disturbance east-southeast of Pohnpei and lasted until its degeneration as a tropical cyclone over southern China. The thirteenth typhoon of the 2013 Pacific typhoon season, Haiyan originated from an area of low pressure several hundred kilometers east-southeast of Pohnpei in the Federated States of Micronesia on November 2. Tracking generally westward, environmental conditions favored tropical cyclogenesis and the system developed into a tropical depression the following day. After becoming a tropical storm and attaining the name Haiyan at 0000 UTC on November 4, the system began a period of rapid intensification that brought it to typhoon intensity by 1800 UTC on November 5. By November 6, the Joint Typhoon Warning Center (JTWC) assessed the system as a Category 5-equivalent super typhoon on the Saffir–Simpson hurricane wind scale; the storm passed over the island of Kayangel in Palau shortly after attaining this strength.

Thereafter, it continued to intensify; at 12:00 UTC on November 7, the Japan Meteorological Agency (JMA) upgraded the storm's maximum ten-minute sustained winds to 230 km/h (64 m/s; 140 mph), the highest in relation to the cyclone. At 1800 UTC, the JTWC estimated the system's one-minute sustained winds to 315 km/h (88 m/s; 196 mph), unofficially making Haiyan the fourth strongest tropical cyclone ever observed. Several hours later, the eye of the cyclone made its first landfall in the Philippines at Guiuan, Eastern Samar, with an intensity of 305 km/h (85 m/s; 190 mph). This ties it with Typhoon Meranti as the second strongest landfall on record by maximum sustained 1-minute wind speeds, after Typhoon Goni. Gradually weakening, the storm made five additional landfalls in the country before emerging over the South China Sea. Turning northwestward, the typhoon eventually struck northern Vietnam as a severe tropical storm on November 10. Haiyan was last noted as a tropical depression by the JMA the following day.

== Origins and intensification ==
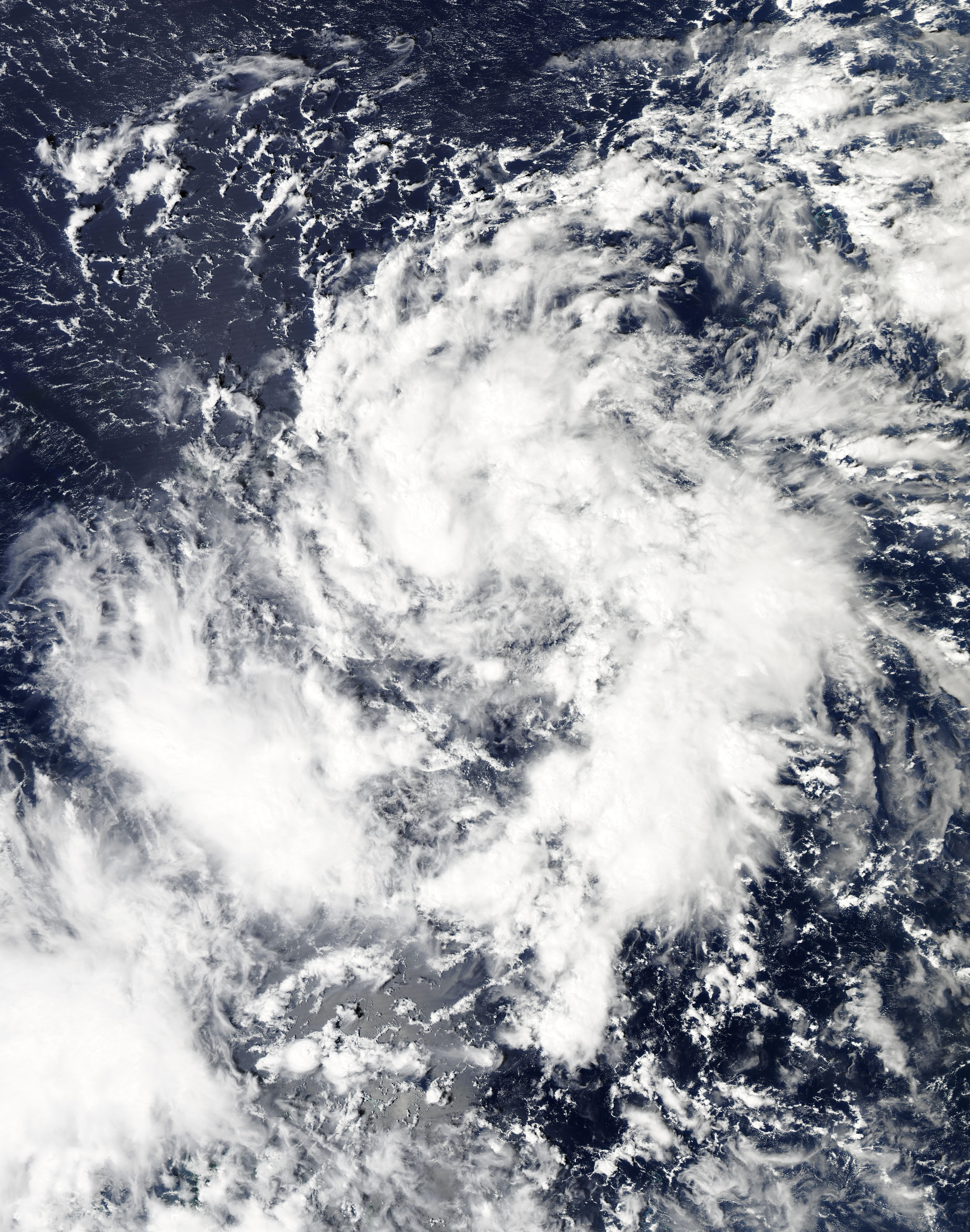
Haiyan becoming organized as a tropical depression on November 3

On November 2, the Joint Typhoon Warning Center (JTWC) began monitoring a broad low-pressure area about 425 km (264 mi) east-southeast of Pohnpei, one of the states in the Federated States of Micronesia. (Note: The Joint Typhoon Warning Center is a joint United States Navy – United States Air Force task force that issues tropical cyclone warnings for the western Pacific Ocean and other regions.) The system featured broken banding features alongside steadily consolidating convection. Environmental conditions ahead of the disturbance favored tropical cyclogenesis and dynamic weather forecast models predicted that a well-defined tropical cyclone would form within 72 hours. Early on November 3, the Japan Meteorological Agency (JMA) classified the system as a tropical depression. (Note: The Japan Meteorological Agency (JMA) is the official Regional Specialized Meteorological Center for the western Pacific Ocean.) Owing to a consolidating low-level circulation center with building deep convection, the JTWC also classified the system as a tropical depression, shortly after issuing a Tropical Cyclone Formation Alert. Subsequent intensification resulted in the JMA upgrading the system to a tropical storm and assigning it the name Haiyan (Chinese: 海燕; lit. 'petrel') at 0000 UTC on November 4. Meanwhile, the JTWC also upgraded it to a tropical storm, when the expansive system was steadily consolidating in an area of weak to moderate vertical wind shear and tracking westward along the southern periphery of a subtropical ridge. By November 5, the storm began to undergo rapid intensification as a prominent central dense overcast (CDO) with an embedded eye began developing. This intensification was fueled by high sea surface temperatures, estimated at 29.5 to 30.5 °C (85.1 to 86.9 °F) which extended to an unusually great depth. At 100 m (330 ft) below the surface, temperatures were 4 to 5 °C (7.2 to 9 °F) above average. In light of the formation of an eye, the JTWC estimated Haiyan to have achieved typhoon status around 0000 UTC that day. The JMA followed suit 12 hours later, by which time the JTWC estimated one-minute sustained winds to have reached 165 km/h (105 mph).

A small typhoon, with a core roughly 110 km (68 mi) across, rapid intensification continued through November 6 as an 11 km (6.8 mi) wide pin-hole eye formed. Upper-level outflow favored further strengthening of the system and was further enhanced by a tropical upper tropospheric trough to the northeast. Intense banding features along the southern periphery of Haiyan wrapped into the system as well. Early on November 6, the JTWC estimated the system to have achieved super typhoon status. (Note: A super typhoon is defined as a tropical cyclone with one-minute sustained winds of at least 240 km/h (67 m/s; 150 mph).) That day, the Philippine Atmospheric, Geophysical and Astronomical Services Administration (PAGASA) assigned the storm the local name Yolanda as it approached their area of responsibility. Intensification slowed somewhat during the day, though the JTWC estimated the storm to have attained Category 5-equivalent status on the Saffir–Simpson hurricane wind scale around 1200 UTC. At this time, Haiyan displayed a 15 km (9.3 mi) wide eye surrounded by a ring of deep convection. Later, the eye of the typhoon passed over the island of Kayangel in Palau. Development continued throughout November 7, and at times, mesovortices were apparent in the typhoon's eye.

== Peak intensity ==
Typhoon Haiyan at peak intensity on November 7

Around 1200 UTC on November 7, Haiyan attained its peak intensity with ten-minute sustained winds of 230 km/h (64 m/s; 140 mph) and a barometric pressure of 895 mbar (hPa; 26.43 inHg). This made it the second-most intense tropical cyclone in the Northwest Pacific Ocean on record, based on wind speeds alone, along with Bess in 1982 and Megi in 2010, only after Tip in 1979. Six hours later, the JTWC estimated Haiyan to have attained one-minute sustained winds of 315 km/h (88 m/s; 196 mph) and gusts up to 378 km/h (105 m/s; 235 mph). This officially ties Haiyan with Typhoon Meranti in 2016 as the fifth-strongest tropical cyclone on record in terms of wind speed, only exceeded by Typhoon Ida (325 km/h) in 1958, Typhoon Violet (335 km/h) in 1961, Typhoon Nancy (345 km/h) in 1961 and Hurricane Patricia (345 km/h) in 2015. However, due to the fact the wind recordings in typhoons were erroneously high during the 1950s and 1960s, it can be said that Haiyan made its way as the second strongest tropical cyclone on record, second only to Hurricane Patricia in 2015. (However, Patricia's winds were directly measured by hurricane hunters aircraft, observations which were not available for Haiyan, so the record is uncertain and comparing the intensities of the two storms is problematic.) The storm displayed some characteristics of an annular tropical cyclone, though a strong convective band remained present along the western side of the system.

Satellite estimates at the time, using the Dvorak technique, reached the maximum level on the scale: T#8.0. The storm's structure exceeded the maximum intensity on the scale as the "Dvorak technique makes no allowance for an eye embedded so deeply in cloud tops as cold as [cold dark gray]," (Note: Cold dark gray refers to the temperature of cloud tops seen on enhanced infrared satellite imagery and indicates values below −81 °C (−114 °F).) as noted by the National Oceanic and Atmospheric Administration's (NOAA) satellite analysis branch. Cloud tops surrounding the eye averaged −80 to −90 °C (−112 to −130 °F), with some areas even deeper. Some automated models initialized its intensity at T#8.1, exceeding the scale's upper bounds. Through satellite estimates, NOAA also estimated that Haiyan may have achieved a minimum pressure as low as 858 mbar (hPa; 25.34 inHg). This would have possibly made Haiyan the strongest tropical cyclone worldwide, however due to lack of hurricane hunters in the West Pacific, this is hard to verify, so Typhoon Tip of 1979 holds the record.

== Philippine landfalls ==
PAGASA Weather radar reflectivity loop of Haiyan making landfall on Leyte Island. Tacloban City was struck by the northern eyewall, the most powerful part of the storm.

At 2040 UTC on November 7, Typhoon Haiyan made landfall in Guiuan, Eastern Samar slightly past peak intensity with 305 km/h (85 m/s; 190 mph) sustained winds, making it one of the strongest landfalling tropical cyclones on record. In terms of one-minute sustained winds from the JTWC, Haiyan was the most powerful storm to strike land on record, later tied with Typhoon Meranti in 2016 and broken by Typhoon Goni in 2020. As Haiyan approached Guiuan, mountainous terrain disrupted the cyclone's low-level inflow, slightly degrading the storm's structure, prompting slow weakening. At 2108 UTC, radar indicated that the cyclone's wind maxima was over the village of Guiuan, produced by a mesovortex in the northern eyewall. The Guiuan radar station failed shortly thereafter, with its radome blown into the Leyte Gulf, despite being designed to withstand the strongest typhoons. As such, radar coverage of Haiyan was largely reduced to just the Cebu City station.

At 2300 UTC, the storm made another landfall on the island of Leyte, centered just south of its capital, Tacloban. Radar and ground observations indicated that the cyclone wind maxima passed over Tacloban, again produced by a mesovortex in the northern eyewall. Despite continued land interaction, the storm remained exceptionally powerful as it hit Leyte. Shortly after the storm moved onshore, around 2320 UTC, a barometer deployed by storm chasers in Tacloban City (24 km (15 mi) north of the center of circulation) measured a pressure of 960.3 mbar (hPa; 28.36 inHg). At 2315 UTC, a barometer at Tacloban Airport about 1.6 km (0.99 mi) south of the chasers measured a pressure of 955.6 mb (hPa; 28.22 inHg). Based on the gradient between these positions, Dr. Jeff Masters of Weather Underground estimated that Haiyan may have had a central pressure of 888 mb (hPa; 26.2 inHg) when it struck Leyte.

As Haiyan moved further into Leyte, it reached the Nacolod mountain range, whose 1500 meter peaks significantly disrupted the storm's low- and mid-level circulation. This caused the northern half of Haiyan's core to collapse. Convection shallowed somewhat, and the eye shrank from 20 nm to under 10 nm, also becoming cloud-filled. Despite this synoptic weakening, the shrinking eye kept windspeeds high due to conservation of angular momentum. At 0006 UTC, the eye crossed the Nacolod and hits Ormoc City, still at category 5 strength. Haiyan then crossed another mountain range to the west of Ormoc before emerging over the Cebu Strait. Marked orographic enhancement over this terrain was evident on radar imagery.

During Haiyan's passage over the Cebu Strait, the core reorganized somewhat. At 0133 UTC, Haiyan made yet another landfall, this time hitting the island of Cebu centered at Daanbantayan. The Cebu City radar station failed shortly thereafter, leaving minimal radar coverage of Haiyan in the Philippines. Haiyan then crossed the mountains of Cebu and briefly emerged over open water. At 0240 UTC, Haiyan made another landfall at Bantayan Island before quickly emerging over the Visayan Sea. At 0400 UTC, Haiyan made another landfall at Concepcion, Iloilo. The storm weakened to category 4 strength shortly thereafter. After its lengthiest land crossing yet, Haiyan emerged over the Mindoro Strait. At 1200 UTC, the storm made its last Philippine landfall at Coron, Palawan as a strong category 4 storm. Haiyan emerged over the South China Sea late on November 8. The storm's core had been substantially disrupted during its passage through the Philippines, with only a partial eyewall remaining intact around a ragged cloud-filled eye. In contrast to the appearance, the JTWC estimated it to have retained winds of 230 km/h (64 m/s; 140 mph) at this time. Similarly the PAGASA maintained its strength as 215 km/h (60 m/s; 134 mph) while the JMA estimated winds at 165 km/h (46 m/s; 103 mph).

== South China Sea and dissipation ==
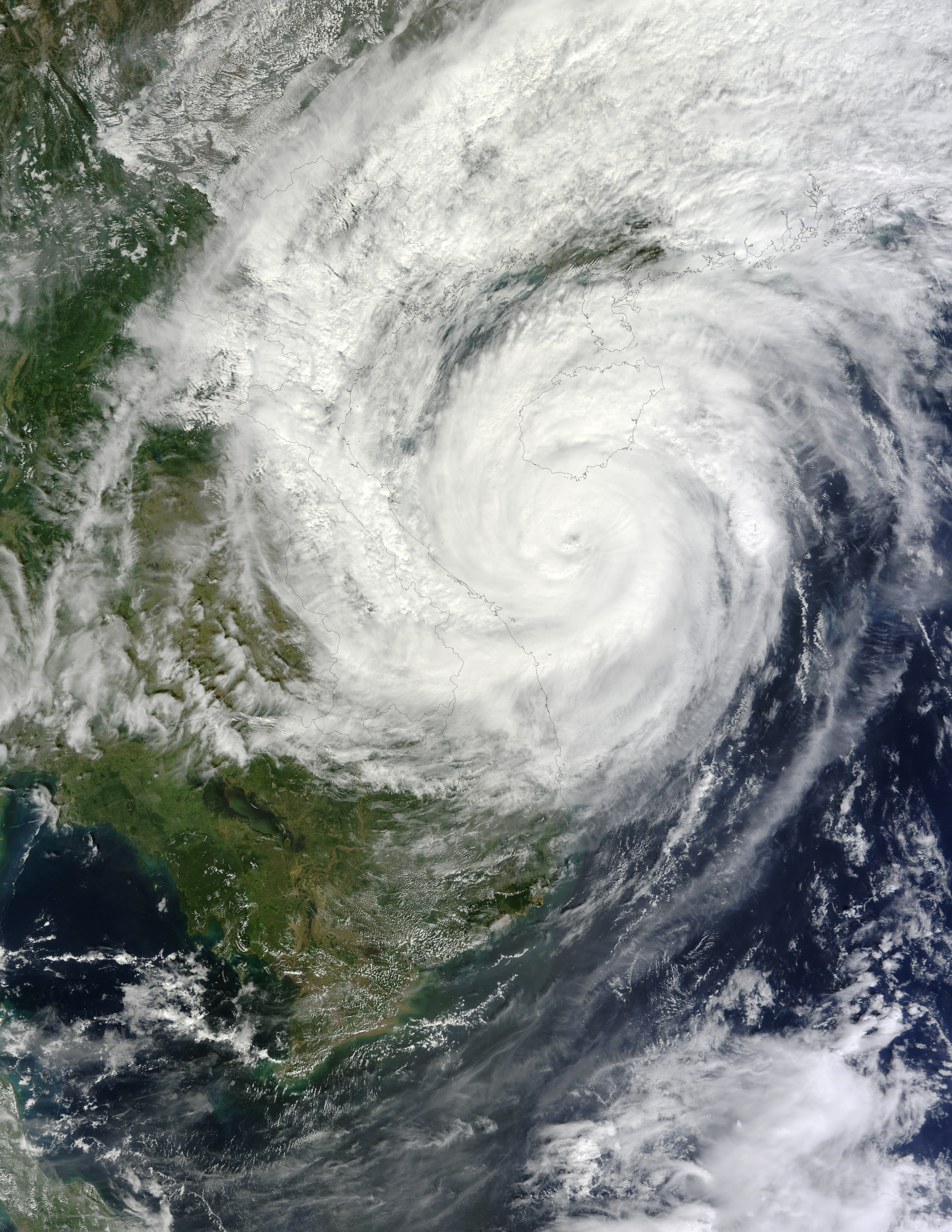
Typhoon Haiyan near central Vietnam and Hainan on November 10

By November 9, some structural reorganization took place with banding features wrapping tightly around a developing eye. Environmental conditions ahead of the storm soon became less favorable, as cool stable air began wrapping into the western side of the circulation. This resulted in shallowing convecting over the center. Continuing across the South China Sea, Haiyan turned more northwesterly late on November 9 and through November 10 as it moved around the southwestern edge of the subtropical ridge previously steering it westward. Throughout November 10, interaction with Hainan Island and Vietnam further weakened the storm as it moved over the Gulf of Tonkin. Rapid weakening ensued as Haiyan approached its final landfall in Vietnam, with increasing wind shear displacing convection to the north of the center of circulation. The storm had also turned more northerly by this point as the subtropical ridge began to erode. Around 2100 UTC, Haiyan made landfall in Haiphong as a severe tropical storm with ten-minute sustained winds of 110 km/h (31 m/s; 68 mph). Once onshore, Haiyan turned more easterly as the mid-latitude westerlies became the primary steering factor. By 1200 UTC on November 11, Haiyan had dissipated as a tropical cyclone, as it moved over Guangxi Province, China.

== See also ==
- Meteorological history of Typhoon Durian
- 2013 Pacific typhoon season
- Typhoons in the Philippines
