= Julie Hall (public health) =

Public health specialist

Julie Lyn Hall MBE is a public health specialist from the United Kingdom.

== Education and career ==
Hall obtained her BSc degree in medical sociology from St Thomas's Hospital Medical School, London University, in 1991. She obtained a diploma from the Royal Australian College of Obstetrics and Gynecology in 1996, specializing in antenatal, intrapartum and postpartum care of women and their families, and reproductive health. She obtained her master's in public health at James Cook University, Queensland in 1998, with studies focused on improving health in remote and rural communities. In 2003, Hall completed her four-year training programme as a public health physician, becoming a member of the Faculty of Public Health, Royal College of Physicians.

Hall first worked with the WHO as a medical officer of the Global Alert and Response Team at the WHO Headquarters in Geneva, Switzerland, during the SARS pandemic. She then became the coordinator for Communicable Disease Surveillance and Response Team in Beijing from 2003 till 2006. She returned to Australia, where she worked as principal medical advisor to the Australian government. In 2008, Hall returned to WHO as team leader for emerging infectious diseases. After this assignment, she was seconded to the UN Secretary General’s Office in Geneva in 2009 to assist with inter-agency coordination during the H1N1 pandemic. She worked at the WHO Western Pacific Regional Office as the executive officer to the regional director from 2010 to 2012. Hall’s last position before her assignment as WHO representative to the Philippines in 2013 was as a global team leader for the eradication of polio in UNICEF New York.

Hall has been noted for her work in coordinating the local response to the health emergencies caused by Typhoon Haiyan (known as “Yolanda” in the Philippines) that struck a large portion of central Philippines on 8 November 2013. The storm, which is regarded as the most powerful recorded typhoon recorded in terms of wind speed, wrought devastation over a vast area in the Visayan provinces of the Philippines, resulting in at least 6,109 deaths and many more displaced and homeless. Before becoming a physician, Hall did relief work in the Philippines, having served as a Red Cross volunteer in Baguio City at age 18.

== Advocacy effort ==
Hall initiated the "Health at the Heart of Healing" advocacy campaign of WHO Philippines as a means of sustaining awareness and support for ongoing health efforts in the Typhoon Yolanda corridor, and subsequent health-related programs and initiatives to follow.
