= John Cosh =

British rheumatologist

John Cosh (1915–2005) was a British rheumatologist. He is known for his long-term studies of the effects of rheumatoid arthritis, co-discovery of the genes associated with rheumatoid arthritis, and his work on the benefits of herbal medicines.

In 1973, with R K Jacoby and M I Jayson, he published an 11-year follow-up of 100 patients newly diagnosed as having rheumatoid arthritis and followed them for a further 30 years, showing that rheumatoid arthritis is a progressive disease impairing function for decades after onset. By 2004 eight of the sample were severely disabled with rheumatoid arthritis, three were less disabled, and only five had normal functioning. Of the 84 who died, median survival was reduced by 10 to 11 years, and the leading cause of death was heart disease.

In 1986 he published, with other rheumatologists, a study that showed the association of rheumatoid arthritis with several human lymphocyte antigens; the associations were stronger in patients with more advanced disease.

John Cosh had originally wanted to be a heart surgeon, but his interests shifted towards cardiology and then to the cardiological aspects of rheumatology. He was born in Bristol, the son of a pharmacist. From Bristol Grammar School he won a scholarship to St John's College, Cambridge, for his pre-clinical studies, and went to St Thomas's Hospital Medical School, London, for his clinical training. He qualified in 1940 and became a house physician at Lambeth Hospital, a satellite hospital of St Thomas's. From there he went to the Royal Hampshire County Hospital in Winchester.

He was called up into the Royal Navy Volunteer Reserve in 1942, serving on Arctic convoys to Murmansk and Archangel, was on the sidelines at the disastrous Dieppe landing, and took part in the landings in Italy in 1943 and 1944. He was mentioned in dispatches in 1945.

After the second world war he went to Bristol to train in cardiology and in 1948 was appointed registrar at Bristol Royal Infirmary, noted for studies in rheumatic heart disease. From 1951 to 1957 he was lecturer in medicine at Bristol University. During this time he published research on vibration sense, patent ductus arteriosus, paroxysmal nodal tachycardia, and primordial germ cells. Rheumatic fever was common at the time, and left many patients, most of them young, with damaged hearts.

In the late 1950s his research interest, and publications, shifted towards rheumatic heart disease and to the long term aspects of rheumatoid arthritis. Altogether he published 51 papers, many of major importance. With John Lever, a pathologist, he edited Rheumatic Diseases and the Heart (Springer Verlag, 1988).

In 1957 he became consultant physician for the Bath clinical area, practising cardiology at the Royal United Hospital and general medicine at the Royal National Hospital for Rheumatic Diseases. He felt he lacked expertise in rheumatic diseases and determined to teach himself. He attended ward rounds with the rheumatologist George Kersley, who appointed him, went to Hammersmith Hospital every week to attend Eric Bywaters' ward rounds, and visited Manchester, which had the United Kingdom's only professorial rheumatology unit. In 1959 he was awarded the Royal College of Physicians' Heberden medal for his research in rheumatology. He retired in 1982.

He retired to Totnes, to be near Dartington Hall, where he could indulge his love of music. Predeceased by his wife, Kate Jackson, he left two sons and a daughter.
