= Anthony Yates =

English rheumatologist and consultant

David Anthony Hilton Yates, FRCP (15 August 1930 – 13 September 2004) was an English rheumatologist and consultant, president of the British Association for Rheumatology and of the Rheumatology and Rehabilitation Section of the Royal Society of Medicine.

== Education ==
Yates was educated at Gresham's School, Holt, Norfolk, and then from 1948 to 1954 at St Thomas's Hospital Medical School at King's College London. As a student he was a water polo and rugby union player and was elected President of the Guy's, King's and St Thomas' Rugby Football Club.

== Career Summary ==
- Consultant and Clinical Director of Department of Physical Medicine at St Thomas' Hospital, 1966-1990
- Director of School of Physiotherapy, St Thomas' Hospital
- Consultant Rheumatologist to King Edward VII Hospital, London
- Consultant at St George's Hospital, 1990-1999

== Career ==
Yates qualified as a physician in 1953. After national service with the British Army in Kenya, Egypt, and the Suez Canal, he became a member of the Royal College of Physicians of London in 1957. His rheumatological training began at St Thomas’s, specialising in locomotor medicine and electrodiagnosis. He also spent a year at the Hammersmith Hospital to train in systemic rheumatology.

He published many research papers on neurophysiology, spinal stenosis and muscle.

In 1966 he became consultant in charge of the department of physical medicine at St Thomas' Hospital and remained in charge until 1990. He was director of the school of physiotherapy at St Thomas’, and also consultant rheumatologist to King Edward VII Hospital and honorary consultant adviser in rheumatology to the British Army. From 1990, he continued in private practice at St George's Hospital until his retirement from clinical practice in 1999.

In the field of rheumatology he was president of the Rheumatology and Rehabilitation Section of the Royal Society of Medicine from 1980. He was President of the British Association for Rheumatology from 1982 to 1984. He contributed to committees at the Royal College of Physicians.

He died following a garden accident in September 2004.

== Degrees ==
- 1953 - Bachelor of Medicine (London)
- 1953 - Bachelor of Surgery (London)
- 1960 - Doctor of Medicine (London)

== Publications ==
- Unilateral sciatica with neurological involvement: a correlated clinical and electrodiagnostic study (1963)
- Epidural myelography: a pioneering technique for evaluating spine problems in the pre-axial tomography days (1965)

== Honours ==
- Lord Riddell Medical Scholarship, 1950
- Member of the Royal College of Physicians, 1957
- Council Prize of the British Association of Physical Medicine, 1965
- Fellow of the Royal College of Physicians, 1973
- Honorary Consultant Adviser in Rheumatology to the British Army
- President of the Rheumatology and Rehabilitation Section of the Royal Society of Medicine, 1980
- President of the British Association for Rheumatology (later the British Society for Rheumatology), 1982-1984

== Other ==
- President of the Guy's, King's and St Thomas' Rugby Football Club
