= Roger Jones (physician) =

British physician, educator and editor

Professor Roger Jones OBE FRCP FRCGP FMedSci
- Born: 1948 (age 77–78)

Roger Hugh Jones OBE FRCP FRCGP FMedSci (born 1948) is a British general practitioner, a professor of general practice, and former editor of the British Journal of General Practice.

== Career ==
Jones was trained at the University of Oxford and at St Thomas' Hospital.

He practised as a GP in Hampshire from 1979. He later worked in Lamberth, London and retired from clinical practice in 2010. He was Wolfson Professor of General Practice at Guy's, King's, and St Thomas' School of Medicine, all in London.

He was the editor of the British Journal of General Practice until April 2020.

He served as the founding President of the Primary Care Society for Gastroenterology and as the founding Chairman of the European Society for Primary Care Gastroenterology.

In 2011, he gave evidence to the United Kingdom's Select Committee on Science and Technology, regarding peer review.

Jones was Chair of the Trustees of the medical charity CORE, formerly the Digestive Disorders Foundation, from 2010–2013. He was Chair of the Trustees of the Royal Medical Benevolent Fund from 2013–2017.

== Honours and awards ==
His is a Fellow of the Royal College of Physicians, Fellow of the Royal College of General Practitioners and Fellow of the Academy of Medical Sciences.

Jones was appointed Officer of the Order of the British Empire (OBE) in the 2021 New Year Honours for services to general practice.
