= British Journal of General Practice =

- Discipline: Family medicine
- Language: English
- Edited by: Euan Lawson

Publication details
- Former name(s): College of General Practitioners' Research Newsletter, Journal of the College of General Practitioners, Journal of the Royal College of General Practitioners
- History: 1953–present
- Publisher: Royal College of General Practitioners (United Kingdom)
- Frequency: Monthly
- Open access: Hybrid
- Impact factor: 5.3 (2023)

Standard abbreviations
- ISO 4: Br. J. Gen. Pract.

Indexing
- ISSN: 0960-1643 (print); 1478-5242 (web)
- OCLC no.: 55135715

Links
- Journal homepage; Online access; Online archive

The British Journal of General Practice is a monthly peer-reviewed medical journal for general practitioners and primary care researchers.

== History ==
The journal was established in 1953 as the College of General Practitioners' Research Newsletter. It was renamed Journal of the College of General Practitioners in 1960 (from 1967 Journal of the Royal College of General Practitioners), before obtaining its current name in 1990. Since 2013, the journal's digital content is hosted by HighWire Press.

Research articles are published as open access. The journal publishes editorials on clinical and policy topics, debate and analysis, clinical guidance, and a section called "Life & Times" which contains reviews of art, books, and film as well as viewpoints, polemic, and entertainment. In the course of its history, the journal has had nine editors: Roger Jones was the editor-in-chief until April 2020 and the current editor is Euan Lawson. The editorial office and the journal team are located at the Royal College of General Practitioners.

== Abstracting and indexing ==
The journal is abstracted and indexed in:

- Index Medicus/MEDLINE/PubMed
- Science Citation Index
- Current Contents/Clinical Medicine
- Scopus

According to the Journal Citation Reports, it has a 2021 impact factor of 6.302.
