= Gilbert Thompson (physician, born 1932) =

British physician and researcher (1932–2026)

Professor Gilbert Thompson MD, FRCP
- Born: 20 November 1932
- Died: 9 January 2026 (aged 93)
- Education: St Thomas' Hospital Medical School
- Occupation: Physician
- Employers: Royal Postgraduate Medical School Hospital; Hammersmith Hospital
- Website: www.imperial.ac.uk/people/g.thompson

Gilbert Richard Thompson, FRCP (20 November 1932 – 9 January 2026) was a British physician and researcher in lipidology.

== Life and career ==
Thompson studied at St Thomas' Hospital Medical School, graduating in 1956.

After National Service, he was at the Royal Postgraduate Medical School Hospital from 1963 to 1998, but including time at Massachusetts General Hospital, the Methodist Hospital, Houston and the Royal Victoria Hospital, Montreal, as a researcher.

He was Honorary Consultant Physician in charge of the lipid clinic at Hammersmith Hospital from 1993 to 1998.

Thompson served as chair of the British Hyperlipidaemia Association and of the British Atherosclerosis Society.

After formally retiring in 1998, he was Emeritus Professor in Clinical Lipidology at Imperial College, London.

Thompson was an associate editor of the Journal of Lipid Research, and founding editor of Current Opinion in Lipidology.

He was awarded the 1981 Lucien Award, "designed to honour outstanding research in the field of circulatory diseases", in Montreal. He was a Distinguished Fellow of the International Atherosclerosis Society, and a Fellow of the Royal College of Physicians.

Thompson died on 9 January 2026, at the age of 93.
