= Gilbert Thompson (physician, born 1728) =

English physician

- Born: 1728; Lancashire
- Died: 1 January 1803 (aged 74–75); London
- Occupation: Physician

Gilbert Thompson (1728 – 1 January 1803) was an English physician.

== Biography ==
Thompson was born in Lancashire in 1728, and for many years kept a well-frequented school near Lancaster, on retiring from which he went to the University of Edinburgh, and graduated doctor of medicine on 8 June 1753. He then went to London, but, meeting with little encouragement as a practitioner, he for a time served as writing-master in a boarding-school at Tottenham, and subsequently became a dispensing assistant to Timothy Bevan, the druggist. About 1765 his uncle, Gilbert Thompson of Penketh, died and left him 4,000l. He then commenced work as a physician in the city, and eventually attained to a fair practice. He was admitted a licentiate of the Royal College of Physicians on 25 June 1770. He died at his house in Salter's Court, Cannon Street, 1 January 1803. He was a quaker, and is represented as a man of great integrity, of mild and unassuming manners, and possessed of considerable learning and professional skill. He was an intimate friend of the physician, John Fothergill. He is said to have been secretary to the Medical Society of London for several years, but there is no entry to this effect in the books of the society; he was a member, and was present at the first meeting in May 1773.

His works were:

- ‘Disputatio Medica Inauguralis de Exercitatione,’ Edinburgh, 1753, 4to.
- ‘A Biographical Memoir of the Life and a View of the Character of the late Dr. Fothergill,’ London, 1782, 8vo.
- ‘Select Translations from Homer and Horace, with original Poems,’ London, 1801, 8vo.
