= Typhoon Vera =

Pacific typhoon in 1959

Typhoon Vera Isewan Typhoon
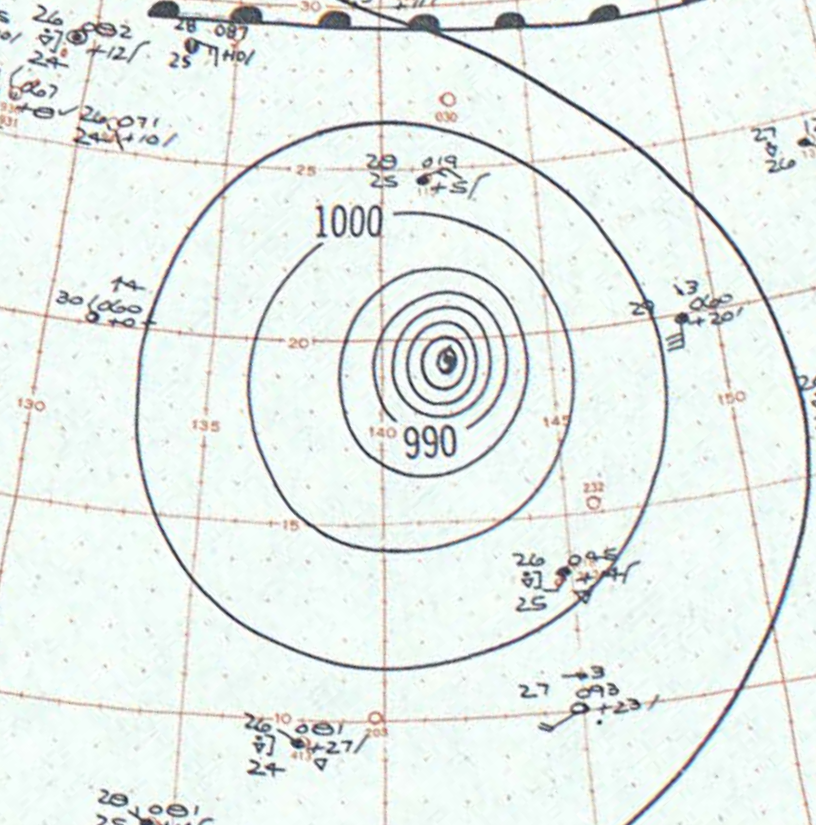
- Surface weather analysis of Typhoon Vera near peak intensity on September 23

Meteorological history
- Formed: September 20, 1959
- Dissipated: September 29, 1959

Violent typhoon
- 10-minute sustained (JMA)
- Lowest pressure: 895 hPa (mbar); 26.43 inHg

Category 5-equivalent super typhoon
- 1-minute sustained (SSHWS/JTWC)
- Highest winds: 305 km/h (190 mph)
- Lowest pressure: 895 hPa (mbar); 26.43 inHg

Overall effects
- Fatalities: 5,098
- Damage: $261 million+ (1959 USD)
- Areas affected: Japan
- IBTrACS /
- Part of the 1959 Pacific typhoon season

Typhoon Vera, also known as the Isewan Typhoon (伊勢湾台風, Ise-wan Taifū), was an exceptionally intense tropical cyclone that struck Japan in September 1959, becoming the strongest and deadliest typhoon on record to make landfall on the country, as well as the only one to do so as a Category 5 equivalent storm. The storm's intensity resulted in catastrophic damage of unparalleled severity and extent, and was a major setback to the Japanese economy, which was still recovering from World War II. In the aftermath of Vera, Japan's disaster management and relief systems were significantly reformed, and the typhoon's effects would set a benchmark for future storms striking the country.

Vera developed on September 20 between Guam and Chuuk State, and initially tracked westward before taking a more northerly course, reaching tropical storm strength the following day. By this point Vera had assumed a more westerly direction of movement and had begun to rapidly intensify, and reached its peak intensity on September 23 with maximum sustained winds equivalent to that of a modern-day Category 5 hurricane. With little change in strength, Vera curved and accelerated northward, resulting in a landfall on September 26 near Shionomisaki on Honshu. Atmospheric wind patterns caused the typhoon to briefly emerge into the Sea of Japan before recurving eastward and moving ashore Honshu for a second time. Movement over land greatly weakened Vera, and after reentering the North Pacific Ocean later that day, Vera transitioned into an extratropical cyclone on September 27; these remnants continued to persist for an additional two days.

Though Vera was accurately forecast and its track into Japan was well anticipated, limited coverage of telecommunications, combined with lack of urgency from Japanese media and the storm's intensity, greatly inhibited potential evacuation and disaster mitigation processes. Rainfall from the storm's outer rainbands began to cause flooding in river basins well in advance of the storm's landfall. Upon moving ashore Honshu, the typhoon brought a strong storm surge that destroyed numerous flood defense systems, inundating coastal regions and sinking ships. Damage totals from Vera reached US$600 million (equivalent to US$6.63 billion in 2025). The number of fatalities caused by Vera remain discrepant, though current estimates indicate that the typhoon caused more than 5,000 deaths, making it one of the deadliest typhoons in Japanese history. It also injured almost 39,000 people and displaced about 1.6 million.

Relief efforts were initiated by Japanese and American governments immediately following Typhoon Vera. Due to the inundation caused by the typhoon, localized epidemics were reported, including those of dysentery and tetanus. The spread of disease and blocking debris slowed the ongoing relief efforts. Due to the unprecedented damage and loss of life following Vera, the National Diet passed legislation in order to more efficiently assist affected regions and mitigate future disasters. This included the passage of the Disaster Countermeasures Basic Act in 1961, which set standards for Japanese disaster relief, including the establishment of the Central Disaster Prevention Council.

== Meteorological history ==
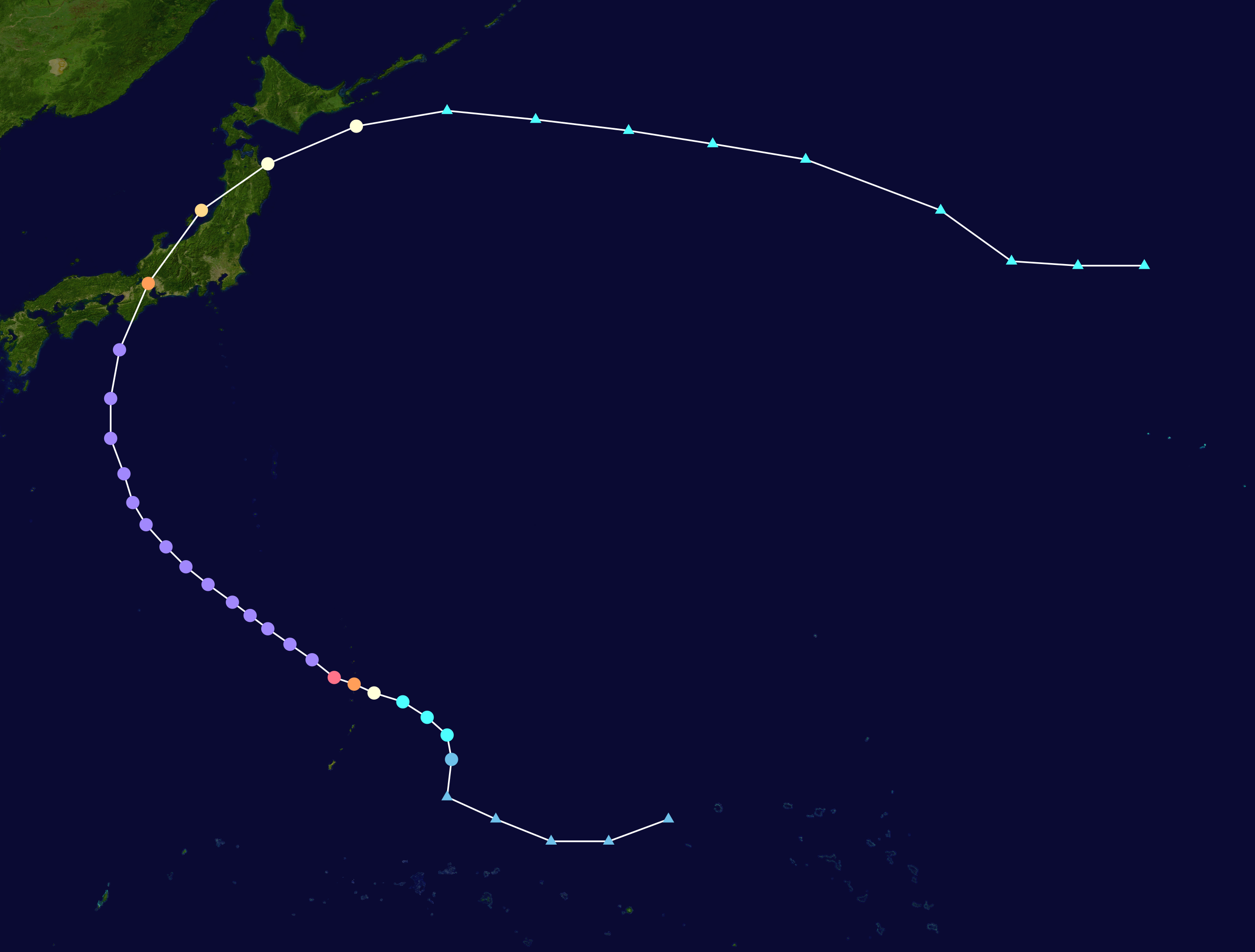
Map plotting the storm's track and intensity, according to the Saffir–Simpson scale Map key Saffir–Simpson scale Tropical depression (≤38 mph, ≤62 km/h) Tropical storm (39–73 mph, 63–118 km/h) Category 1 (74–95 mph, 119–153 km/h) Category 2 (96–110 mph, 154–177 km/h) Category 3 (111–129 mph, 178–208 km/h) Category 4 (130–156 mph, 209–251 km/h) Category 5 (≥157 mph, ≥252 km/h) Unknown Storm type Tropical cyclone Subtropical cyclone Extratropical cyclone, remnant low, tropical disturbance, or monsoon depression

The origin of Typhoon Vera can be traced back to a diffuse area of low pressure first incorporated into surface weather analysis early on September 20. At the time, the disturbance was situated between Guam and Chuuk State. Though the Joint Typhoon Warning Center (JTWC) did not classify the incipient system as a tropical cyclone, the Japan Meteorological Agency (JMA) analyzed the disturbance to be a tropical depression as early as 0000 UTC that day. Initially, the depression tracked westward, but transiently shifted to a more northerly course on September 21. Late that day, a reconnaissance airplane dispatched by the JTWC to analyze the disturbance failed to reach its center due to engine failure. However, the data collected from the storm's periphery was sufficient for the warning center to classify the depression as a tropical storm at 1800 UTC that day. Despite the flight data, the JMA had already determined the system to have been of at least tropical storm intensity six hours earlier. As a result of the reclassification, the tropical storm was designated the name Vera by the JTWC. At this point the tropical cyclone began to take a more westerly course.

Early on September 22, an aircraft fix located Vera 175 km (110 mi) north-northeast of Saipan. Throughout the course of the day, periodic reconnaissance flights into the storm indicated that Vera had begun to rapidly intensify. By 1800 UTC later that day, data analysis concluded that the tropical cyclone had reached typhoon intensity. Rapid intensification continued into the following day, as the typhoon's maximum sustained winds and barometric pressure quickly rose and fell, respectively. Concurrently, Vera's size grew to a point at which it spanned 250 km (155 mi) across. At 0600 UTC the following day, Vera achieved its minimum estimated barometric pressure at 895 mbar (hPa; 26.43 inHg). This indicated a 75 mbar (hPa; 2.22 inHg) pressure drop in the preceding 24 hours. Upon reaching its minimum pressure, Vera was estimated to have attained winds equivalent to a Category 5 – the highest classification possible on the modern-day Saffir–Simpson hurricane wind scale. The typhoon's winds continued to increase before peaking at 1200 UTC on September 23, when reconnaissance aircraft reported maximum sustained winds of 305 km/h (190 mph). Upon peaking in wind speed, Vera was located 645 km (400 mi) northeast of Guam. The tropical cyclone's ability to quickly intensify was attributed to conducive atmospheric divergence and highly sustainable sea surface temperatures.

Vera only maintained peak intensity for roughly twelve hours, but still remained a powerful tropical cyclone. With very little change in strength, the typhoon tracked northwestward throughout September 24. Due to the influence of a nearby high-pressure area, Vera began to gradually curve and rapidly accelerate northward towards Japan. At 0900 UTC on September 26, Vera made its first landfall on Honshu, just west of Shionomisaki. At the time, the typhoon had maximum sustained winds of 260 km/h (160 mph), equivalent to a Category 5 super typhoon, and a barometric pressure of 920 mbar (hPa; 27.17 inHg). Vera traversed the Japanese island rather quickly at a speed 61 km/h (38 mph), and emerged into the Sea of Japan at 1530 UTC that day. Despite its short stint over land, the terrain greatly weakened the tropical cyclone. Tracking into a westerly wind flow, Vera was forced eastward, resulting in a second landfall near Sakata, Honshu, with an intensity equivalent to that of a Category 1 hurricane. Vera re-emerged into the North Pacific Ocean late on September 26, having weakened due to advection of cold air in addition to continued land interaction. At 0600 UTC on September 27, the JTWC analyzed the typhoon to have weakened to tropical storm intensity. The warning center discontinued its periodic monitoring of the system, as Vera had begun to transition into an extratropical cyclone. Consequently, the JMA officially reclassified the system as an extratropical storm at 1200 UTC that day. Vera's extratropical remnants continued to persist and track eastward for the next two days before the JMA last noted the storm at 1200 UTC on September 29.

== Impact ==
Significant typhoons with special names (from the Japan Meteorological Agency)
Name	Number	Japanese name
Ida	T4518	Makurazaki Typhoon (枕崎台風)
Louise	T4523	Akune Typhoon (阿久根台風)
Marie	T5415	Tōya Maru Typhoon (洞爺丸台風)
Ida	T5822	Kanogawa Typhoon (狩野川台風)
Sarah	T5914	Miyakojima Typhoon (宮古島台風)
Vera	T5915	Isewan Typhoon (伊勢湾台風)
Nancy	T6118	2nd Muroto Typhoon (第2室戸台風)
Cora	T6618	2nd Miyakojima Typhoon (第2宮古島台風)
Della	T6816	3rd Miyakojima Typhoon (第3宮古島台風)
Babe	T7709	Okinoerabu Typhoon (沖永良部台風)
Faxai	T1915	Reiwa 1 Bōsō Peninsula Typhoon (令和元年房総半島台風)
Hagibis	T1919	Reiwa 1 East Japan Typhoon (令和元年東日本台風)

Despite being well forecast and tracked throughout its duration, Typhoon Vera's effects were highly disastrous and long-lasting. In addition to the storm's intensity, the severe damage and large death tolls were partially attributed to a lack of urgency from Japanese media in advance of Vera's landfall. Though estimates for damage costs indicated totals in excess of US$261 million (equivalent to US$2.88 billion in 2025), other damage estimates suggested that damage costs were as high as US$600 million (equivalent to US$6.63 billion in 2025). Death tolls also remain unclear, but reports generally indicated that around 5,000 people were killed, with hundreds of other persons missing. In addition to the dead nearly 40,000 people were injured, and an additional 1.6 million people were rendered homeless. Countrywide approximately 834,000 homes were destroyed and roughly 210,000 ha (520,000 ac) of agricultural fields were damaged. The damage wrought by Vera made it the deadliest typhoon in Japanese history, succeeding the 1934 Muroto typhoon. Vera was also the third deadliest natural disaster in Japan during the 20th century, only behind the Great Hanshin earthquake in 1995 and the Great Kantō earthquake in 1923.

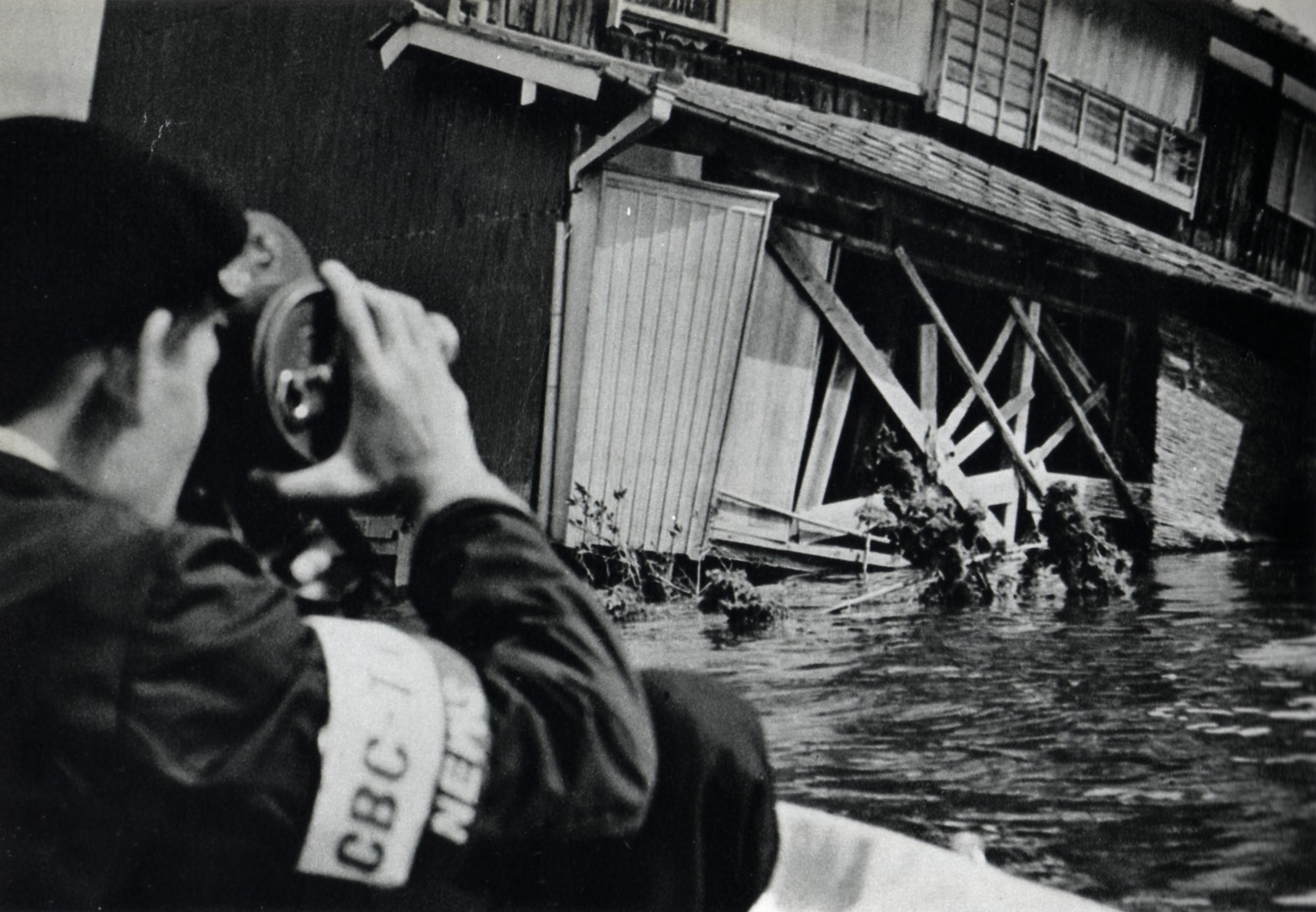
A CBC camera crew in a suburb of Nagoya in the wake of Typhoon Vera

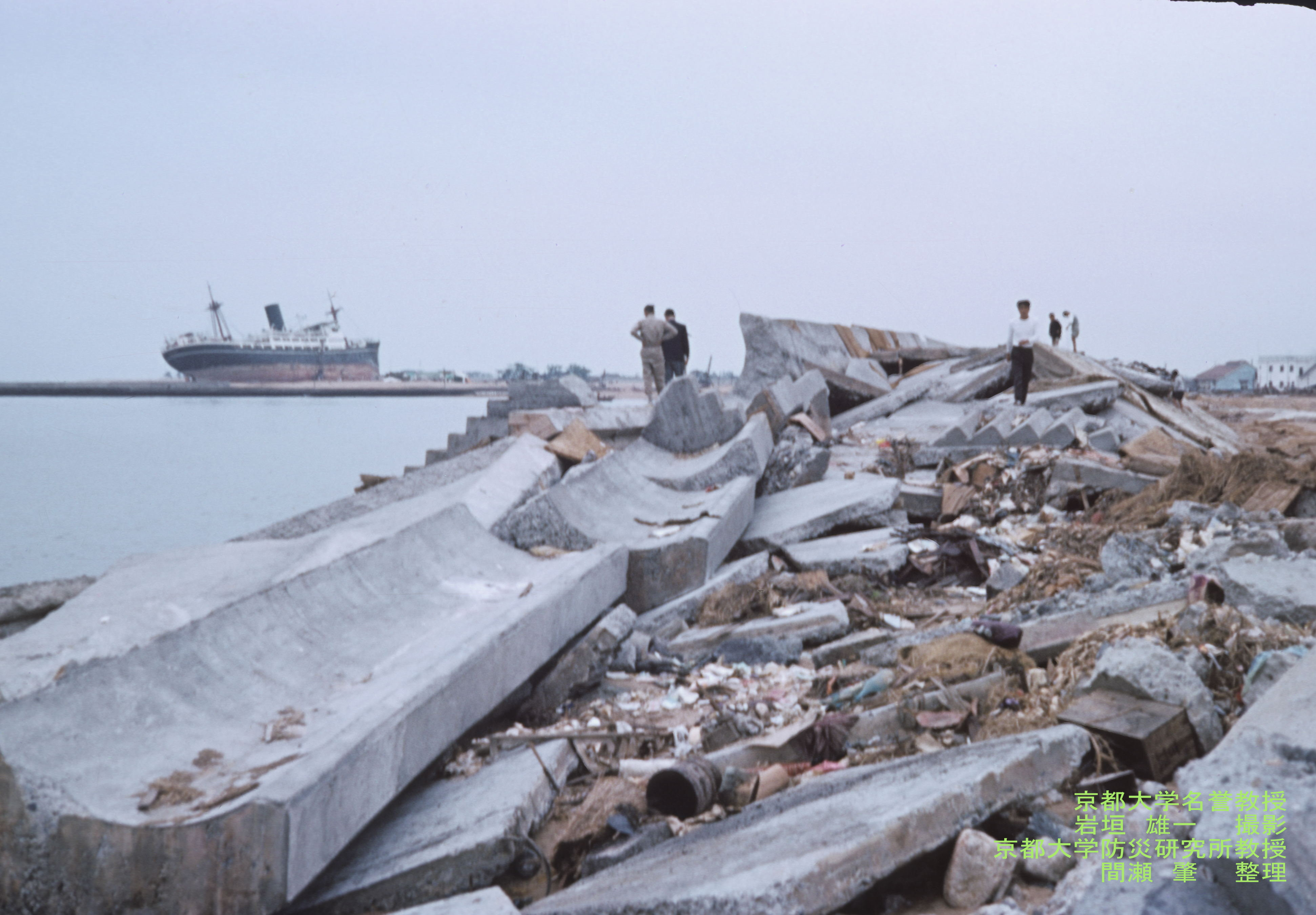
Damage to a seawall caused by Typhoon Vera

Well in advance of Vera's landfall, heavy rainfall ahead of the typhoon occurred across the Tōkai region of Japan starting on September 23, when the storm reached peak intensity over open waters. In Nagoya, rainfall totals reached 10 cm (4 in). In other parts of the Tōkai region, nearly 20 cm (8 in) of rain was reported. The precipitation caused flooding along several river basins in the swath of rain. Steady rainfall occurred throughout Vera's passage of Honshu, though the worst of the rain-induced flooding occurred well after the typhoon's initial landfall. In Kawakami, Nara, a landslide killed 60 people after crushing 12 homes.

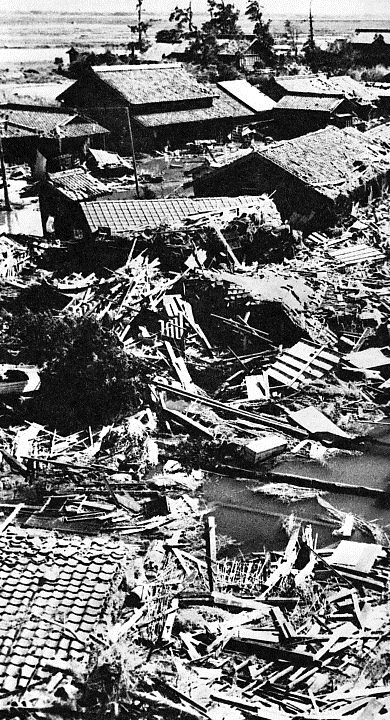
Typhoon Vera damage at Handa

Most of the damage associated with Vera was a result of highly destructive storm surge. At the coast, the typhoon's intensity resulted in a strong storm surge that inundated low-lying coastal regions. In Ise Bay, storm surge heights were greatly enhanced due to the curvature of the land and the bay's shallow depth, which allowed water to be easily driven the length of the bay towards the coast. In addition, the storm passed the area at high tide. Water levels began to rise prior to Vera's landfall and peaked during the typhoon's first traversal of Honshu. The highest storm surge measurement was observed in the Port of Nagoya, where water levels peaked 3.9 m (13 ft) above normal. The intense storm surge easily engulfed or breached earthen levees and other flood prevention mechanisms around Ise Bay. However, these coastal dykes still remained partially unfinished and were seriously impacted by Vera's storm surge. Only newly installed flood mitigation systems along the southern portion of the bay were able to withstand the wave action. Offshore, the waves sunk 25 fishing boats, with thousands of other ships grounded or missing. In total, damage was reported to 7,576 vessels. In addition to the damaged craft, numerous oyster rafts were also lost, with losses totaling US$6 million. Also, 75 million individual pearl oysters were lost to the waves, resulting in US$10 million in additional losses.

Bloated bodies—human and cattle—float in muddy, brown floodwaters that enveloped 95 percent of Nagashima when Typhoon Vera turned the rivers into raging killers.

— "Japan Counts 1,710 Dead in Wake of Typhoon Vera". The Ludington Daily News. Vol. 69, no. 276. Associated Press. September 29, 1959.

The resulting inundation caused by Vera's storm surge submerged areas around the periphery of the bay for extended periods of time, with some low-lying areas remaining underwater in excess of four months. Due to the failure of multiple flood mitigation systems in quick succession, coupled with the narrow coverage of telecommunications exacerbated by Vera's strong winds, many persons in affected regions had very little time to evacuate. Nagoya was one of the worst impacted cities by Vera, and as a result of the storm surge and wind, its harbor was put out of service in under three hours. The effects of the typhoon's storm surge there were further worsened by the destruction of lumber yards in Nagoya Harbor, which set loose large quantities of logs that caused considerable damage to structures. The release of logs also hampered relief efforts following the typhoon's passage. Citywide, 50,000 homes were severely damaged by flood waters, and 1,800 other residences were washed away off of their foundations. Total damage to crops was estimated at US$30 million. Rice crops sustained heavy impacts, with 150,000 tons (135,000 tonnes) of rice lost. In addition to the crop damage, US$2.5 million worth of fruits and US$4 million worth of vegetables were lost. The collapse of a single apartment home in the city buried 84 people under debris; a similar incident in Naka, Ibaraki buried roughly 300 people. Beach houses were destroyed, and large swaths of nearby cropland were heavily damaged. In addition to the storm surge, Nagoya experienced sustained winds of about 145 km/h (90 mph), with gusts reaching as high as 260 km/h (160 mph), downing power lines and causing power outage. Southeast of Nagoya, in Handa, Aichi, around 300 people were killed after Vera's waves engulfed more than 250 homes. Casualties throughout Aichi totaled 3,168 and roughly 59,000 people were injured, based on an enumeration conducted in March 1960.

On the western side of Ise Bay, in Mie Prefecture, 1,233 people were killed, with approximately 5,500 others sustaining injuries. Approximately 95% of Nagashima was submerged underwater. Nearby Kuwuna suffered a similar fate as 80% of the city proper was flooded. There, 58 people were killed and 800 others were displaced. The towns of Kamezaki and Kamiyoshi were also wiped out by the flood inundation. Further inland, in Nagano Prefecture, strong winds unroofed numerous homes. The United States Air Force's Tachikawa Airfield near Tokyo sustained significant damage from the typhoon, with damage costs totaling in excess of US$1 million.

== Aftermath ==
Deadliest Pacific typhoons
Rank	Typhoon	Season	Fatalities	Ref.
1	August 1931 China typhoon	1931	300,000	
2	Nina	1975	229,000	
3	July 1780 Typhoon	1780	100,000	
4	July 1862 Typhoon	1862	80,000	
5	"Shantou"	1922	60,000	
6	"China"	1912	50,000	
7	"Hong Kong"	1937	10,000	
8	Joan	1964	7,000	
9	Haiyan	2013	6,352	
10	Vera	1959	>5,000	
Main article: List of tropical cyclone records

In the immediate aftermath following Typhoon Vera, the Japanese government established a disaster headquarters in Tokyo and allocated resources to aid impacted areas. The government also set up the Central Japan Disaster Relief Department in Nagoya. Due to the large estimated damage cost of Vera's impacts, Japanese parliament was forced to introduce a supplementary national budget to cover the losses. Beginning on September 27, refuge shelters were opened and local government agencies assisted in rescuing stranded civilians. On September 29, the Japan Self-Defense Forces began to take part in the relief effort. United States lieutenant general Robert Whitney Burns ordered all available servicemen stationed in Japan to take part in typhoon relief efforts. The USS Kearsarge was dispatched to Nagoya to assist in relief efforts there. In Nagoya, the flood waters contaminated drinking water, greatly reducing clean water supplies. Despite rapid sanitation and disinfection work, disease epidemic broke out in parts of the city. Over 170 cases of dysentery were reported, along with other cases of gangrene and tetanus. In addition to water shortage, food rationing, which had been prompted due to food shortages caused by Vera, resulted in hunger issues for impacted populations.

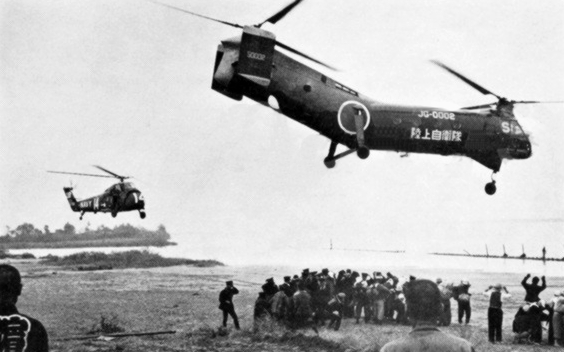
An American HSS-1 helicopter and Japanese Model 44A helicopter evacuating affected civilians

As a result of breaches in flood defenses around Ise Bay, seawater continued to pour into inundated areas after Vera's passage, slowing down repair efforts. One breach spanning 150 km (93 mi) across required 5,000 personnel, 32,000 sandbags, and bulldozers dispatched by the Japanese Ministry of Defense to relieve water flow. In Aichi's Ama District, reconstruction efforts for levees, roadways, and infrastructure lasted until the end of December 1959. Due to losses sustained by the pearl industry as a result of the typhoon, Japanese pearl production in 1959 was expected to decrease by 30% in 1959, with production losses of 40% expected in 1960. Monetary losses to the industry were expected to eclipse US$15 million, causing Japanese pearl costs to hike up by 20%. Furthermore, the effects of Vera on the country's pearl industry were expected to persist for two to three years.

=== Disaster relief and mitigation reformation ===
The unprecedented destruction caused by Vera prompted Japanese parliament to pass legislation in order to more efficiently assist affected regions and mitigate future disasters. In October 1959, a special parliamentary session enacted several measures coordinated by various government ministries and provided subsidiaries to persons effected by Vera and other natural disasters in Japan from August and September of that year. A long lasting legislation prompted by Vera's effects was the 1961 passage of the Disaster Countermeasures Basic Act, widely regarded as the "cornerstone of legislation on disaster risk reduction in Japan." The act established the Central Disaster Prevention Council, which was set to coordinate disaster risk reduction. The legislation also mandated an annual disaster prevention plan, to be submitted to the Japanese parliament yearly. Finally, the act established September 1 as a National Disaster Prevention Day.

In addition to legislative reform, the breaching of coastal flood defense systems during Vera prompted a redesign of such mechanisms. In Nagoya, regulation was created for coastal construction and their heights. Development of flood defenses in Ise, Osaka, and Tokyo bays was also set into motion. The heights of such defense systems were based on worst-case scenarios and maximum storm surge heights caused by the typhoon.

== See also ==
- Typhoon Nancy (1961) – similarly strong tropical cyclone that caused extensive damage, primarily in Osaka; also known as the 2nd Muroto typhoon
