= November 1964 Vietnam floods =

Devastating floods in Vietnam on the middle of Vietnam War (1964)

- Date: November 1964
- Location: Central Vietnam
- Cause: Three tropical cyclones with Vietnamese landfalls on November 4 (Iris), November 8 (Joan), and November 16 (Kate)
- Deaths: Approximately 7,000

In November 1964, the quick succession of three typhoons—Iris, Joan, and Kate—caused widespread flooding in Vietnam. Constituting part of a very active typhoon season, the three typhoons made landfalls in South Vietnam within a 12-day period. The floods occurred against the backdrop of the escalating Vietnam War. Hardest-hit were the central provinces of South Vietnam where the storms moved ashore. Approximately 7,000 people were killed and over a million people were displaced by the storms as floods inundated over 20,000 km^{2} (7,500 mi^{2}) of land. An estimated 54,000 homes were destroyed.

Typhoons Iris, Joan, and Kate made landfall on the coast of Vietnam on November 4, November 8, and November 16, respectively. Individually, Joan was the most damaging, though each exacerbated the impacts of preceding storms. A plurality of fatalities occurred in Quảng Nam Province and Quảng Tín Province. Excessive rainfall caused rivers to overflow, destroying entire villages and inflicting numerous casualties. Heavy losses were sustained by the remaining unharvested rice crop in central Vietnam. U.S. and South Vietnamese military officials stated that the disaster caused a larger setback to their war effort than the Viet Cong had done. A widespread relief effort involving several countries began in the wake of the floods, resulting in the challenging distribution of food, shelter, and medical supplies amid conflict within a contested region.

== Background and synopsis ==
Tropical cyclones affecting Vietnam in November 1964

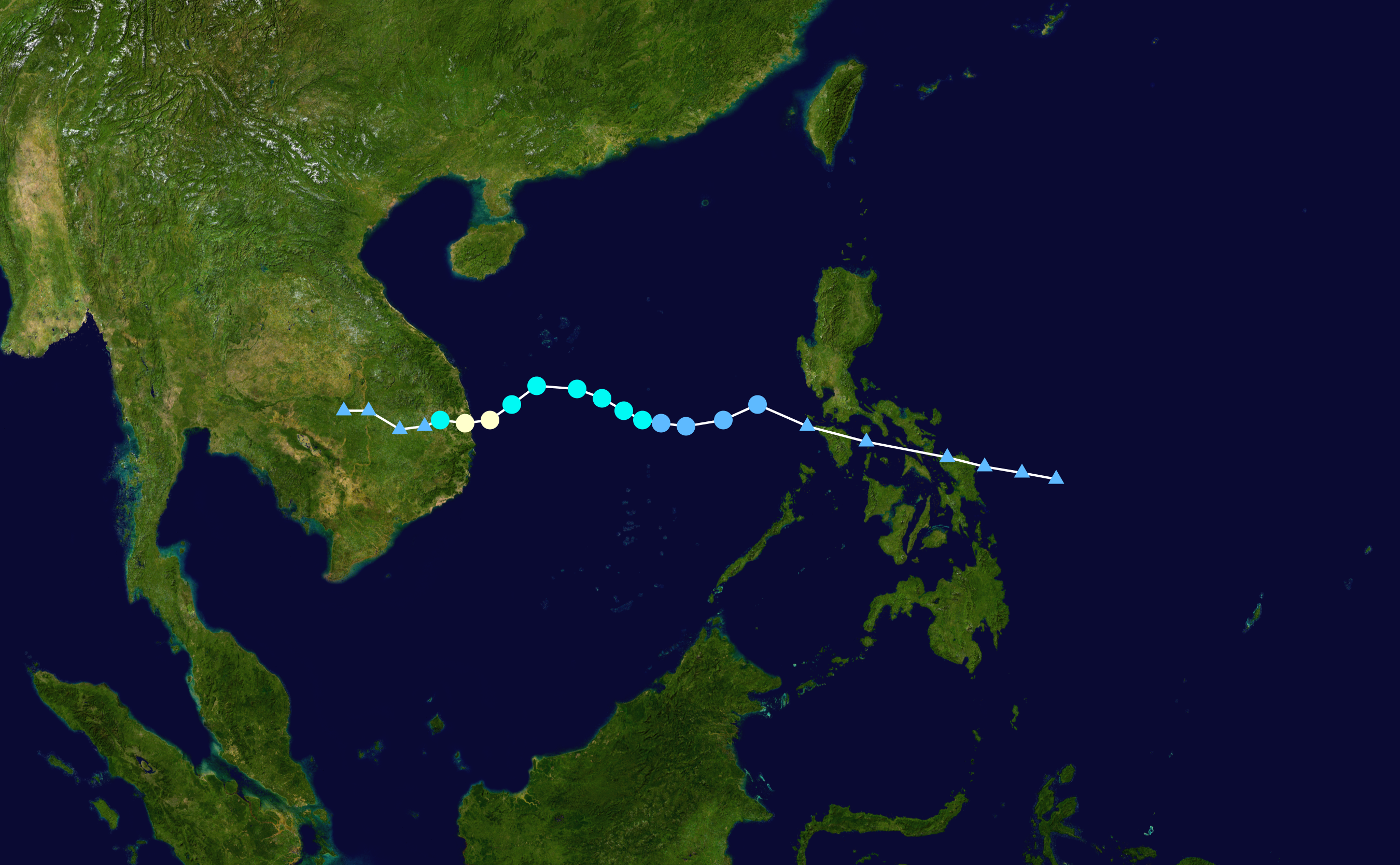
The track of Typhoon Iris, which struck Vietnam on November 4

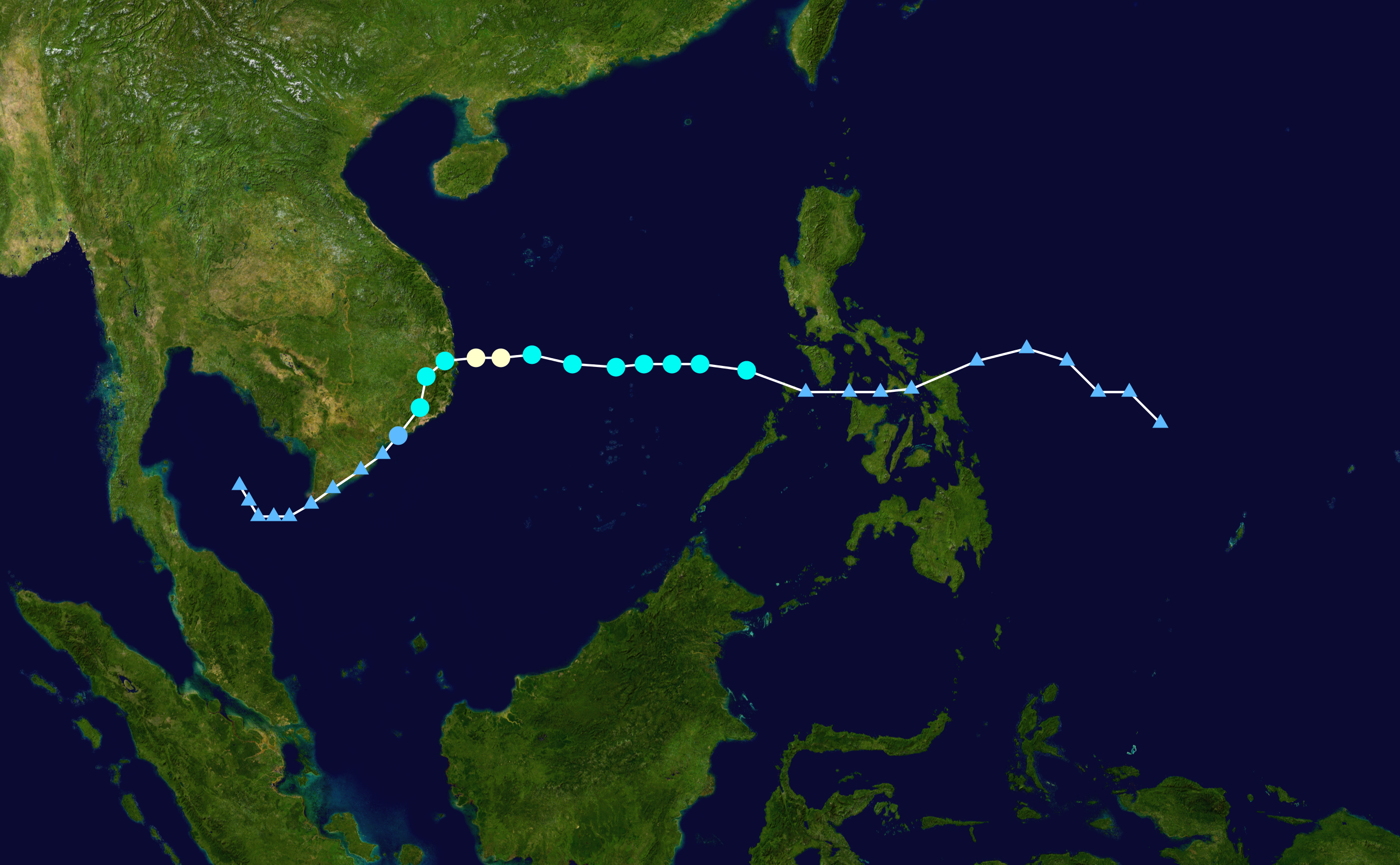
The track of Typhoon Joan, which struck Vietnam on November 8

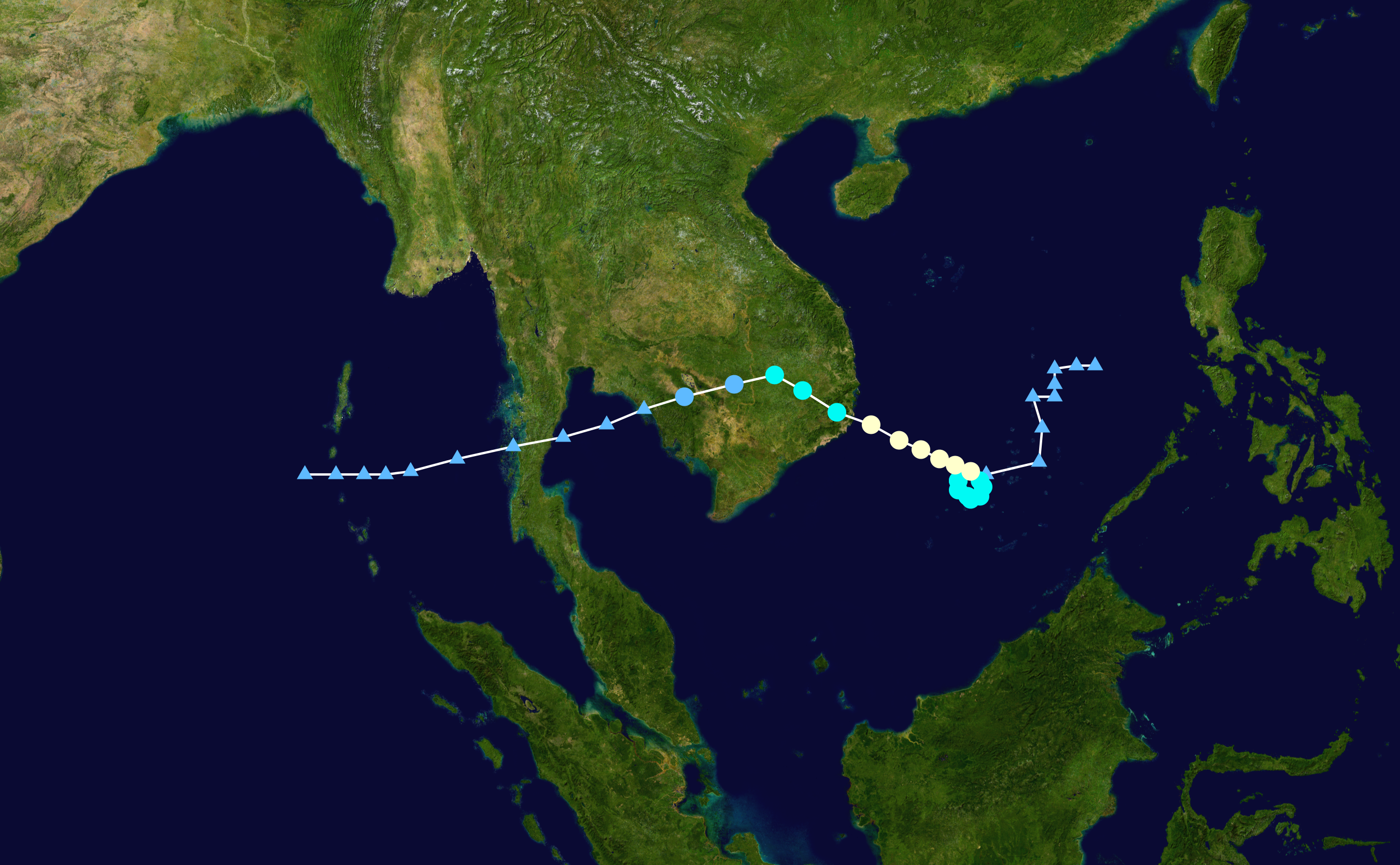
The track of Typhoon Kate, which struck Vietnam on November 16

The 1964 typhoon season was the most active Pacific typhoon season on record, due in part to unusually strong tropical waves that were prevalent in the latter-half of the year. According to the Mariners Weather Log, six tropical cyclones formed in the western Pacific in November 1964, of which four became typhoons; this represented unusually high tropical activity for the month. Vietnam had been struck by three other typhoons—Tilda, Winnie, and Violet—earlier in the year, which along with Iris, Joan, and Kate in November constituted a total of six typhoons striking the country between the 11th and 22nd parallel north in 1964, along with two other tropical storms.

Typhoons Iris, Joan, and Kate made landfalls on Vietnam within a 12-day period in November. The first storm, Iris, may have developed from a tropical disturbance east of Samar in the Philippines as early as October 31 according to tracking data from the Japan Meteorological Agency (JMA). Weather observations detected the system, named Iris, as it tracked westward South China Sea in early November. Iris strengthened into a low-end typhoon with one-minute maximum sustained winds of 120 km/h (75 mph) on October 4 as estimated by the Joint Typhoon Warning Center (JTWC) shortly before moving ashore South Vietnam near Qui Nhơn. The storm weakened quickly over the rough terrain of Southeast Asia, and dissipated inland on November 5.

Like Iris, Typhoon Joan may have begun to develop east on the Philippines as early as November 4 according to data from the JMA. The incipient system moved west into the South China Sea, and on November 6 ships reported the presence of a tropical storm with winds of 75 km/h (45 mph). The system, named Joan, became a typhoon on November 8 and attained peak one-minute sustained winds of 130 km/h (70 mph) before making landfall on Vietnam north of Nha Trang later that day. Heavy rains associated with Joan had already been impacting Vietnam days ahead of landfall. Joan quickly weakened inland, though its remnants may have persisted on a southwestward course into the Gulf of Thailand for five more days.

Typhoon Kate formed within the South China Sea in mid-November and organized into a tropical storm by November 13. It took an initially erratic path, reversing and shifting its heading several times before embarking on a more steady west-northwestward course on November 15. Kate became a typhoon later that day and struck the Vietnamese coast near Nha Trang on November 16; one-minute sustained winds just prior to landfall were estimated by the JTWC at around 120 km/h (75 mph).

== Impact and aftermath ==
Deadliest Pacific typhoons
Rank	Typhoon	Season	Fatalities	Ref.
1	"Shanghai"	1931	302,040	
2	Nina	1975	229,000	
3	Unnamed	1780	100,000	
4	Unnamed	1862	80,000	
5	"Shantou"	1922	60,000	
6	"China"	1912	50,000	
7	"Hong Kong"	1937	10,000	
8	Joan	1964	7,000	
9	Haiyan	2013	6,352	
10	Vera	1959	>5,000	
Main article: List of tropical cyclone records

Seven thousand people were killed and over a million people were left homeless by the three typhoons in the central provinces of South Vietnam, with roughly a third of the country affected. Early estimates placed the number of homeless across four Vietnamese provinces at between 0.8 and 1.2 million. Around 1,000 mm (40 in) of rain fell within the first ten days in November. Some areas recorded rainfall for 15 consecutive days. Over 20,000 km^{2} (7,500 mi^{2}) of land was flooded by storms' rains across a 320 km-long (200 mi) strip of the country. The deluge was the most severe in at least six decades, obliterating hamlets in mountain valleys and coastal plains and wiping out the central Vietnamese rice crop. Some areas experienced total loss of their crops. However, the completion of the rice harvest in most areas prior to the flood mitigated losses. Flood inundation stood as high as 6 m (20 ft) atop rice-growing areas. Thousands of water buffalo also drowned in the flood, comprising part of the significant loss of livestock in Quảng Nam and three other provinces; some areas saw the loss of 80 percent of livestock.

An estimated 90 percent of property across three provinces were damaged. The South Vietnamese press estimated the loss of 54,000 homes. Floods destroyed 14,000 homes in Quảng Tín Province and 1,400 homes in Quảng Nam Province; another 36,000 homes were damaged in Quảng Nam. Along the coast, ships of the Republic of Vietnam Navy's coastal patrol fleet were either destroyed or damaged. United Press International described it as "the worst storm disaster in South Vietnam's history". Its scale interrupted the ongoing Vietnam War as the conflict's belligerents aided storm-stricken areas. The U.S. and South Vietnamese militaries reported that the flooding inflicting greater losses to their war effort than the Viet Cong had done cumulatively since 1954. An American military advisor stated that the floods "hurt [American] communications more than thousands of tons of Viet Cong explosives could have done". Floodwaters destroyed bridges and hamstrung rail and truck transportation utilized by the joint forces. Roughly 320 km (200 mi) of the only meridional railroad in Vietnam was washed out. A bridge linking Da Nang and the insular base of the 2nd Division of the Army of the Republic of Vietnam was washed out. South Vietnamese military installations and American supply depots were also damaged by the storms. By comparison, American intelligence believed that North Vietnamese guerrilla forces sustained fewer losses; the South Vietnamese military believed that underground storehouses and ammunition supplies used by the guerrilla forces were damaged by the storm, potentially delaying a winter offensive by at least two months.

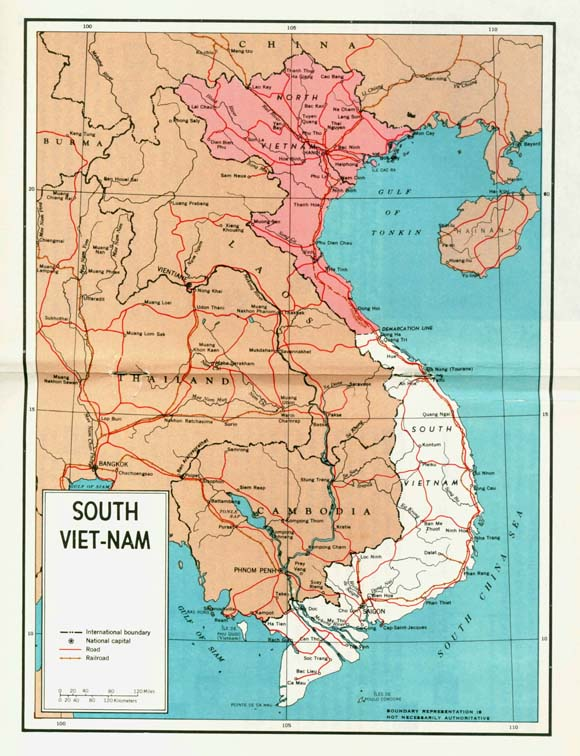
Map of North and South Vietnam from a 1964 U.S. government pamphlet

Qui Nhơn reported heavy damage from the storms. Approximately 3,000 homes were destroyed in the city by Typhoon Iris. Winds unroofed many homes and heavy rainfall lasted for several days. The barracks of the U.S. 117th Aviation Company were damaged by the storm's winds, forcing its occupants to seek shelter in concrete outhouses. The adverse conditions caused by Iris's passage disrupted ongoing flood relief operations started in response to storms earlier in the year, grounding U.S. Marine Corps flights outside of emergency medical evacuations. Typhoon Joan was more destructive than Iris and impacted similar areas. Qui Nhơn was once again an epicenter of devastation, and lay submerged by 0.6–0.9 m-deep (2–3 ft) floodwaters in Joan's wake. All communications with the city were severed. Nearby villages reportedly saw floods rising to rooftops, causing thatched homes to cave in. Some thatched homes were left 10 m (30 ft) high in trees. "Heavy casualties" were reported throughout Bình Định Province. At the base of the 117th Aviation Company, the floods reached a depth of 1.2–1.5 m (4–5 ft). Reuters described the flooding in Quảng Ngãi, where at least a thousand people were killed, as "the worst flooding in many years". Six riverside villages in Quảng Nam Province were rent asunder by swollen rivers, leading to the deaths of some 2,000 people; at least 2,500 people were killed throughout the province. Giang Hoa was destroyed by a landslide that killed 400 of the village's 480 residents. At least 2,600 fatalities occurred in Quảng Tín Province according to Bert Fraleigh, the associate deputy director of the U.S. Operations Mission to Vietnam. Ahead of Typhoon Kate, all Saigon area schools were closed. The U.S. Air Force evacuated its jet bombers and fighter aircraft from Tan Son Nhut Air Base. Although Kate was expected to be a significant flood threat to the Saigon area, the typhoon was less damaging than anticipated.

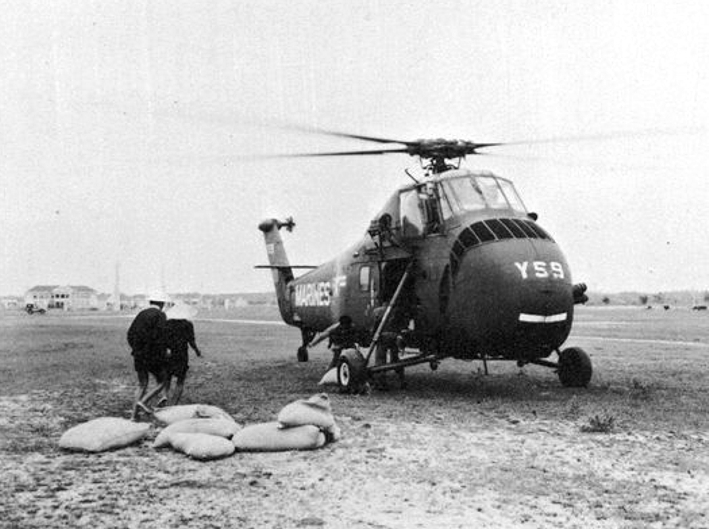
A U.S. Marine Corps Sikorsky H-34 helicopter readying relief supplies for South Vietnam

Between five and ten thousand refugees migrated to Tuy Hòa. Helicopter evacuations amid the floods were primarily handled by the U.S. 119th Assault Helicopter Company. Eighteen helicopters evacuated 854 people to Cheo Reo over the course of 210 flights ahead of imminent flooding. At times, conditions during the operation forced the helicopters to turn back; the flights encountered fire from Viet Cong guerrilla forces and cloud ceilings estimated at 90 m (300 ft). Two helicopters were hit, leading to two injuries. The same helicopter company also delivered 6,350 kg (14,000 lb) of rice to isolated communities as part of a joint Vietnamese and American relief effort in Phú Bổn Province. A statement from the government of South Vietnam appealed for aid from "the people of the free world" with "national solidarity no longer sufficient to respond to the enormous needs of a population curelly stricken" by the floods. The USS Princeton (CV-37) ferried 660 metric tons (600 tons) of supplies to Qui Nhơn. An estimated 500,000–750,000 people required food relief, equating to 45,000–65,000 metric tons (50,000–70,000 tons) of grains as a stopgap before a subsequent rice harvest. The U.S. Air Force also dispatched emergency supplies for 45,000 people in the Da Nang area. Additional supplies were brought in from Okinawa and the Philippines.

The resulting food shortage in the floods' aftermath led to conflicts over the relief supplies, including one incident involving a guerrilla ambush of an American supply depot in Quảng Ngãi. North Vietnamese state media alleged that South Vietnamese and American forces were raiding impacted communities while the American press alleged the same of the North Vietnamese. Martial law was declared in six South Vietnamese provinces affected by the floods to hinder the Viet Cong advance into coastal regions. North Vietnamese president Ho Chi Minh offered 9,000 metric tons (10,000 tons) in medical supplies, 18,000 metric tons (20,000 tons) of rice, and 1.8 million meters (6 million feet) of textile fabrics to those in displaced in South Vietnam, to be distributed by the Viet Cong and International Red Cross. The American Red Cross granted $15,000 towards food, medical supplies, and shelter. Canada and the United Kingdom contributed blankets and cloths to the relief effort while the government of New Zealand granted £10,000 to South Vietnam. A team of logistical and medical experts were deployed by commander of U.S. forces William Westmoreland. Vaccines for the plague, typhoid, and typhus were sent to central Vietnam to thwart potential epidemics. A few cases of cholera were reported within the disaster zone. Aerial tours of the affected areas were carried out by Prime Minister of South Vietnam Trần Văn Hương, Deputy Prime Minister of South Vietnam Nguyễn Xuân Oánh, Welfare Secretary of South Vietnam Dam Sy Hien, and U.S. Ambassador to South Vietnam Maxwell D. Taylor.

== See also ==
- 1964 Pacific typhoon season
- 1999 Vietnamese floods
- 2018 Vietnam floods
- 2019 Vietnam floods
- 2020 Central Vietnam floods
