= 1912 China typhoon =

Tropical cyclone affecting China

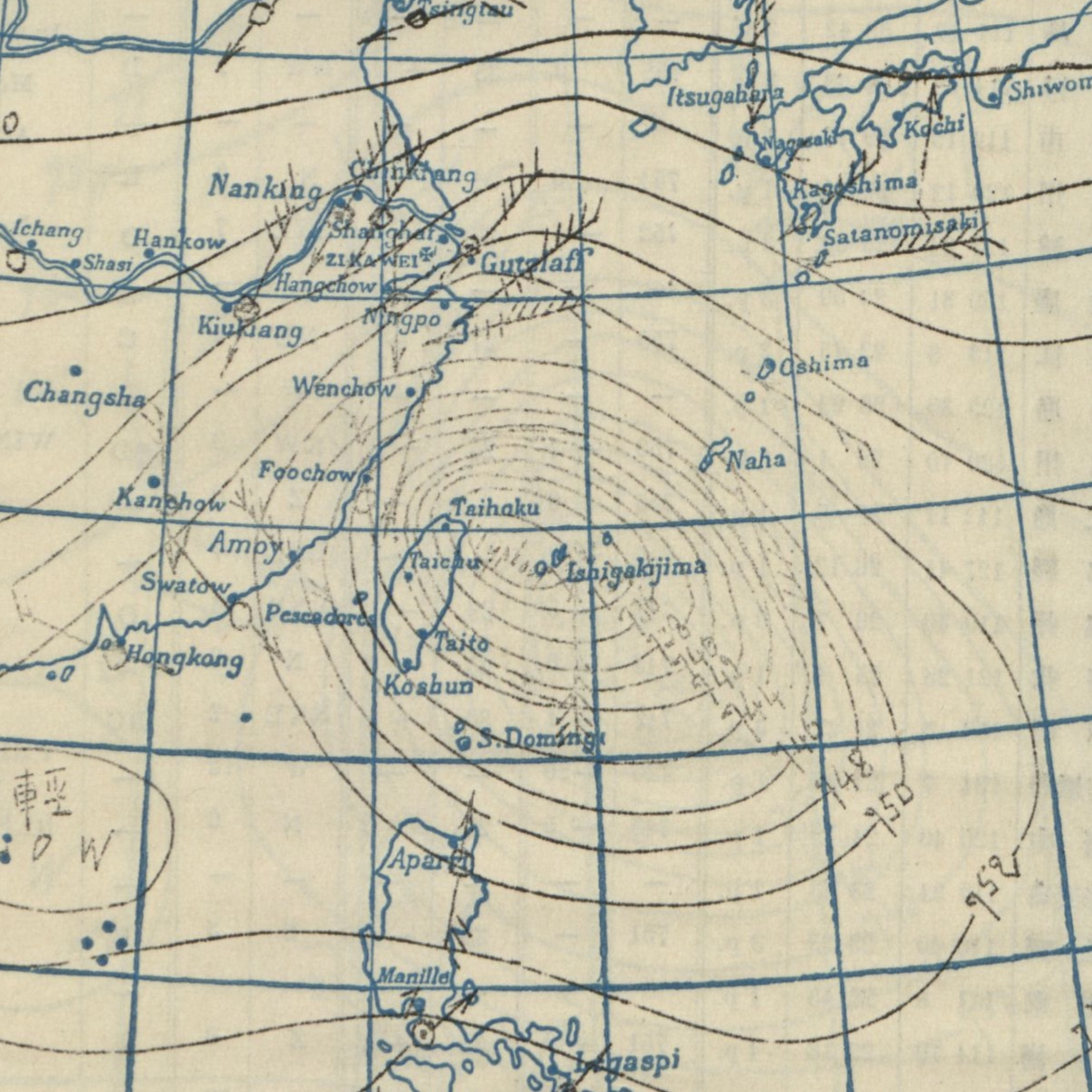

Meteorological history
- Formed: August 25, 1912
- Dissipated: September 1, 1912

Typhoon
- Lowest pressure: 946 hPa (mbar); 27.94 inHg

Overall effects
- Fatalities: 50,000–220,000
- Areas affected: China
- Part of the 1912 Pacific typhoon season

The 1912 China Typhoon was an extremely deadly tropical cyclone that devastated the coast of China on August 29, 1912. It formed in the Philippine Sea, before making its way to China. The typhoon brought strong winds and substantial amounts of rain. Heavy flooding along rivers were reported in Zhejiang, resulting in 50,000–220,000 fatalities. It is one of the deadliest recorded typhoons in history.

== Meteorological history ==
According to the Hong Kong Observatory, the storm began forming on August 13, and on August 25, became a typhoon. It formed in the Philippine Sea, east of northern Luzon. There was a significant low-pressure area around the Philippines. The following day (August 26), pressure significantly decreased over the Loochoos (Ryukyu Islands), and slightly over northern Luzon, Formosa (Taiwan), and the southeastern coast of China. It traveled in a northwardly direction, and by 06:00 HKT, it was at ~20°N 125°E. By 27 August at 06:00 HKT, its track curved westwards. Its reported location at 06:00 HKT was 26°N 122°E. At this time, pressure readings at Formosa had decreased dramatically. A slight pressure decrease was reported over Annam, the Philippines, and northern China. A weak pressure decrease was reported over northeastern China. Observations on the Loochoos at 14:50 HKT indicated that the typhoon was traveling in a north–northeast direction. On the morning of August 28, it was reported to be 50 mi (80 km) southeast of Ishigaki, traveling in a northwest direction. The typhoon arrived over China on August 29, where it was described as "severe" at 06:00 HKT. At 14:00 HKO, it arrived over Sharp Peak, Hong Kong, and traveled westwards. The typhoon became a depression on August 31, between Pakhoi (Beihai) and Hong Kong; and on September 1, was over Hainan and Annam. At its maximum, the typhoon had wind speeds of 115 mph (185 km/h), and lowest pressure was 946 mb.

== Impact ==
Deadliest Pacific typhoons
Rank	Typhoon	Season	Fatalities	Ref.
1	"Shanghai"	1931	302,040	
2	Nina	1975	229,000	
3	Unnamed	1780	100,000	
4	Unnamed	1862	80,000	
5	"Shantou"	1922	60,000	
6	"China"	1912	50,000	
7	"Hong Kong"	1937	10,000	
8	Joan	1964	7,000	
9	Haiyan	2013	6,352	
10	Vera	1959	>5,000	
Main article: List of tropical cyclone records

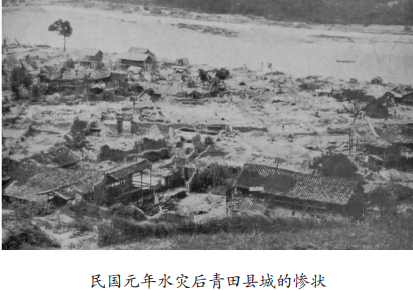
The devastating scene in Qingtian County after the flood.

The typhoon is one of the worst in history, resulting in at least 50,000 killed, according to the National Oceanic and Atmospheric Administration. An estimated 100,000 families were affected. Shen Bao, a major newspaper in Shanghai, placed the death toll at 220,000. Some international newspapers reported 40,000 deaths. High tide and torrential rain for 24 hours caused flooding in upper Wenzhou. Chaozhou prefecture was destroyed. In Qingtian and nearby towns, the flood drowned 10,000 residents. An estimated 30,000–40,000 people died in Pingyang and Rui'an.

Flooding of the Ou River affected the Wenzhou, Qingtian and Yunhe. Swelling of the river in the mountains caused large volumes of water to pour downwards. Large waves crashed into populated areas suddenly, resulting in extreme destruction. The North China Herald described the rapid-flowing water rising "four or five feet" in a few minutes. Survivors reported the destruction of one town, and all of its residents perished.

Infrastructures in many areas of southern Zhejiang were badly damaged. Rain and communication networks were also destroyed, worsening the situation. Fishermen rescuing their catch drowned when their boats capsized. Eight fishermen were believed to have perished when they were swept to sea but returned four days later. The wreckage of towns were mistaken for shipwrecks. Beaches were strewn with debris, where survivors began foraging items.

== Aftermath ==
A civilian-led rescue commenced immediately after the disaster. The cooperation of civilians and officials led to 150–200 lives saved. Recovery efforts were completed by the regional government—the central government did not provide significant assistance. Reconstruction was funded by the regional government and foreign aid arrived.
