= 1922 Shantou typhoon =

Severe tropical cyclone in southeastern China

1922 Shantou Typhoon
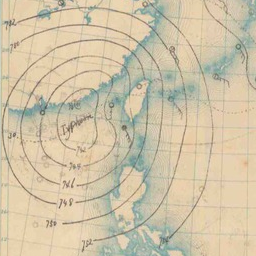

Meteorological history
- Formed: July 27, 1922
- Dissipated: August 3, 1922

Very strong typhoon
- 10-minute sustained (JMA)
- Highest winds: 155 km/h (100 mph)
- Lowest pressure: ≤932 hPa (mbar); ≤27.52 inHg

Overall effects
- Fatalities: 50,000–100,000+
- Areas affected: Northern Philippines, China
- Part of the 1922 Pacific typhoon season

The 1922 Shantou Typhoon was a devastating tropical cyclone that caused thousands of deaths in the Chinese city of Shantou in August 1922. This death toll makes it one of the deadliest known typhoons in history.

== Meteorological history ==
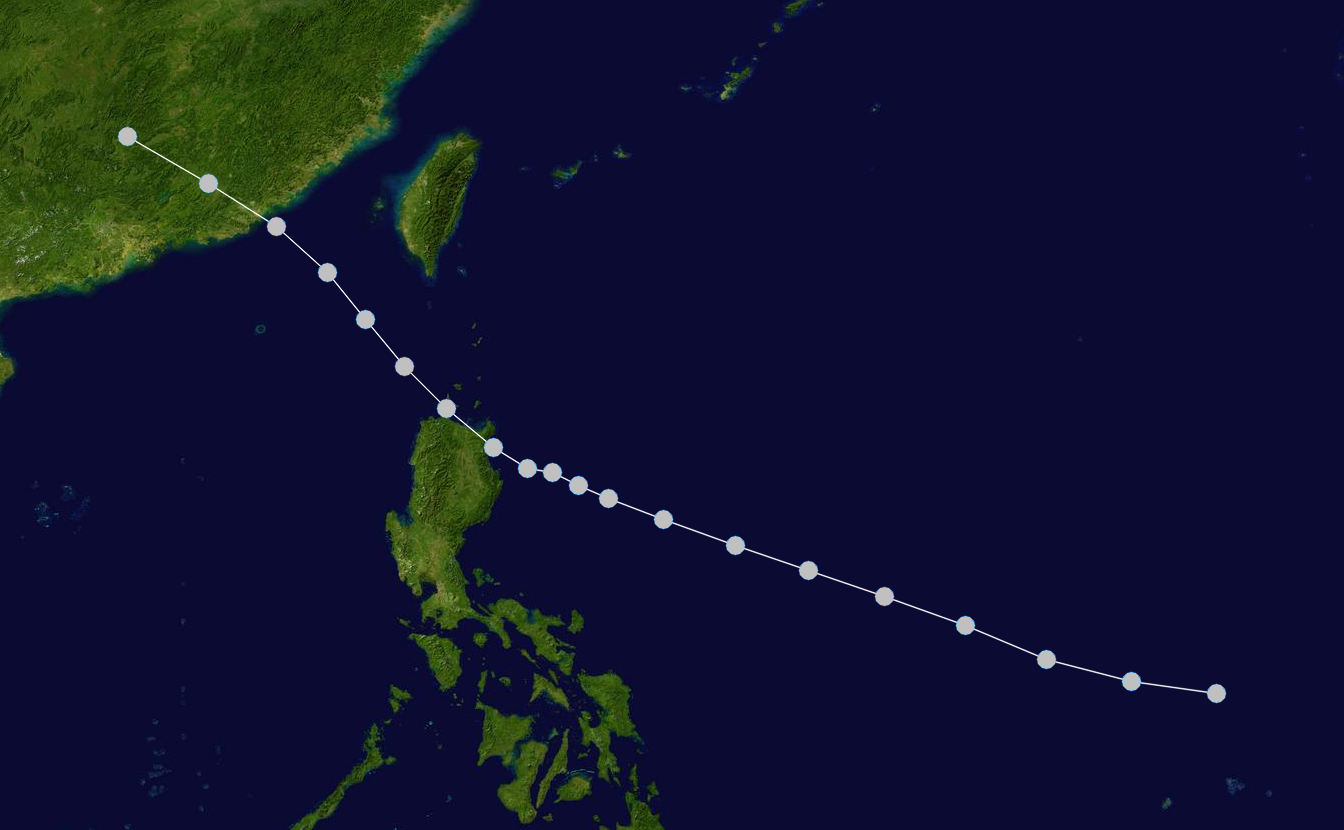
Map plotting the storm's track and intensity, according to the Saffir–Simpson scale Map key Saffir–Simpson scale Tropical depression (≤38 mph, ≤62 km/h) Tropical storm (39–73 mph, 63–118 km/h) Category 1 (74–95 mph, 119–153 km/h) Category 2 (96–110 mph, 154–177 km/h) Category 3 (111–129 mph, 178–208 km/h) Category 4 (130–156 mph, 209–251 km/h) Category 5 (≥157 mph, ≥252 km/h) Unknown Storm type Tropical cyclone Subtropical cyclone Extratropical cyclone, remnant low, tropical disturbance, or monsoon depression

A tropical depression located near the Caroline Islands was first spotted July 27. It moved slowly to the northwest, gradually intensifying along the Philippine Sea. On July 31, it crossed northern Luzon, and entered the northernmost part of the South China Sea. It then intensified more and made landfall on the Chinese coast near the city of Shantou (formerly romanized as Swatow) late on August 2 or early on August 3. It quickly dissipated inland later.

The minimum known central pressure of this typhoon is 27.53 inches of mercury (932 mb). At one point, the winds were estimated to have a speed exceeding 100 mph.

== Impact ==
Deadliest Pacific typhoons
Rank	Typhoon	Season	Fatalities	Ref.
1	"Shanghai"	1931	302,040	
2	Nina	1975	229,000	
3	Unnamed	1780	100,000	
4	Unnamed	1862	80,000	
5	"Shantou"	1922	60,000	
6	"China"	1912	50,000	
7	"Hong Kong"	1937	10,000	
8	Joan	1964	7,000	
9	Haiyan	2013	6,352	
10	Vera	1959	>5,000	
Main article: List of tropical cyclone records

Due to the typhoon passing through a then-lightly inhabited part of the Philippines, no reports of significant impact were received.

In Shantou, the typhoon caused a storm surge of at least 12 ft above normal. The rain was heavy, and left enough water to leave the land saturated for a few days. Shantou was an unfortunate city, as around 5,000 people (out of a population of about 65,000) perished in the storm. Some nearby villages were totally destroyed. Several ships near the coast were totally wrecked. Other ones were blown as far as two miles inland. The area around the city had around another 50,000 casualties. The total death toll was above 60,000, and may have been higher than 100,000.

The 50,000 to 100,000 deaths–100,000+ deaths caused by this typhoon make it one of the deadliest tropical cyclones in the western north Pacific Ocean. The other typhoons with comparable death totals include another typhoon that hit China in 1912 and 1975's Typhoon Nina.
