= FHFS =

FHFS may refer to:

- Dihydrofolate synthase, an enzyme

== See also ==
- FHF (disambiguation)
