= 1882 Manila typhoon =

Pacific typhoon in 1882

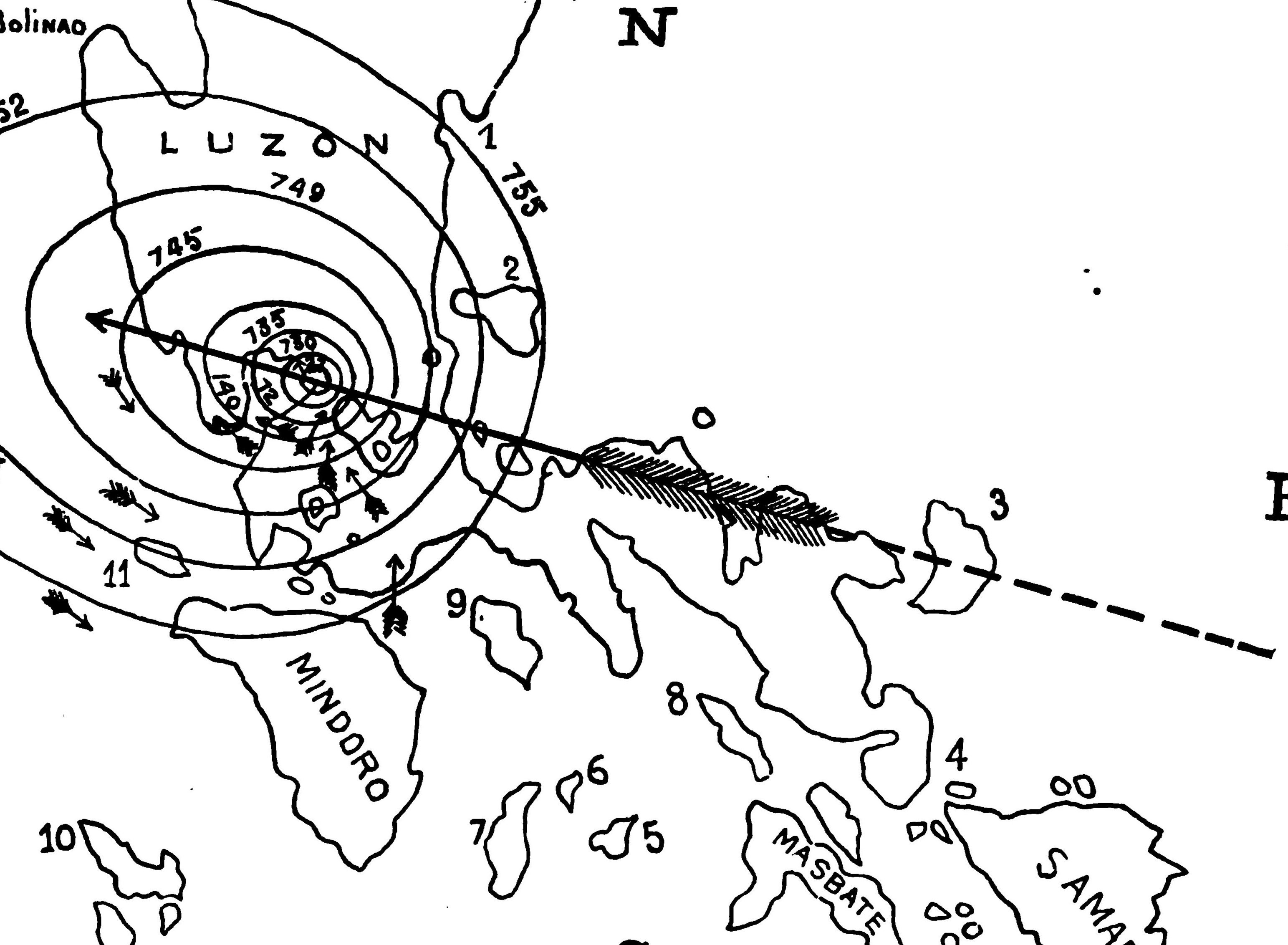
- Track of the 1882 Manila typhoon

Meteorological history
- Formed: fl. 19 October 1882
- Dissipated: fl. 22 October 1882

Typhoon
- Highest winds: 230 km/h (145 mph)
- Lowest pressure: 960 hPa (mbar); 28.35 inHg

Overall effects
- Fatalities: Unknown
- Areas affected: Captaincy General of the Philippines (now Philippines)
- Part of the 1882 Pacific typhoon season

The 1882 Manila typhoon was an intense typhoon that struck the Philippines during October 1882.

== Meteorological history ==
The typhoon was first identified 370 nautical miles (690 km) southeast of the Philippines on October 19. Tracking west-northwestwards towards Manila, it made its first landfall over Catanduanes the next day. After that, it then made five more landfalls over Luzon, passing over Manila with sustained winds of at least 145 mph (235 km/h) and a minimum pressure of 960 hPa (28 inHg). Moving into the South China Sea on October 22, the typhoon was not tracked further.

== Preparations and impact ==
The most intense typhoon to strike the Philippines since 1831, the typhoon caused significant impacts when it passed over Manila. The Variedades Theatre was destroyed, with the Tondo Theatre suffering significant impacts. Several tobacco factories in the city were damaged as well. In Santa Lucia, eleven vessels wound up on the shore, with a further six suffering some damage. A barometer in the city was able to record winds of 145 mph (235 km/h) before being damaged. In Ermita, only one house survived the typhoon, while every house in Sampaloc lost their roofs. Additionally, all governmental offices and hospitals in Manila were destroyed. At least six men died when pieces of iron roofing collapsed on them and were blown a distance by the typhoon's winds. Over sixty thousand people went homeless in the city alone.
