= 1964 flood =

1964 flood may refer to:

- November 1964 Vietnam floods
- Christmas flood of 1964, affected the U.S. Pacific Northwest
- 1964 Zagreb flood, affected northern Croatia and Slovenia
