= FHF =

FHF may refer to:

- Bifluoride
- Fachhochschule Flensburg, a vocational university in Flensburg, Germany
- Fachhochschule Furtwangen, now the Furtwangen University of Applied Sciences, in Germany
- Feast of Hate and Fear, a defunct fanzine
- Félag hljómplötuframleiðenda, an Icelandic organization
- FGF homologous factor
- The Fred Hollows Foundation, an Australian medical aid organization
- Friends of Hue Foundation, an American relief organization
- Fulminant hepatic failure
- Haitian Football Federation, (French: Fédération Haïtienne de Football)
