= Friends of Hue Foundation =

- Founded: 2000
- Type: 501(c)(3)
- Headquarters: San Jose, California
- Region served: Huế, Vietnam
- Services: Children's Shelter at Xuan Phu, HIPE Teaches Proper Sanitation Habits, Thriive lends to local businesses

The Friends of Hue Foundation (FHF) is a 501(c)(3) charitable, non-profit tax-exempt, non-governmental organization officially created in May 2000 in response to the destruction caused by the 1999 Vietnamese floods. Because of its extreme climate and its location directly between the two main cities of the country, Ho Chi Minh City and Hanoi, the Thừa Thiên–Huế Province never flourished much economically and was thus particularly devastated in the event of these floods. Co-founded officially by James M. Freeman and Lieu Thi Dang, FHF's chief goals were to uplift and empower the Huế Province community in both the short and long term through economic, medical, and educational initiatives. FHF continues to be the only registered American non-governmental organization in Huế, Vietnam.

== Initiatives ==
FHF is a multifaceted and flexible NGO that has three main initiatives, each focusing on a different aspect of the foundation's chief goals: Socioeconomic Initiative, Health Initiative and Children's Shelter

== Socioeconomic Initiative ==
=== Alternative Microfinance ===
FHF is partnered with Thriive, an initiative originally known as the Social Microenterprise Initiative (SMI) under the Arthur B. Schultz Foundation and that is now an independent organization with close ties to its parent foundation. One of the main goals of the Arthur B Schultz Foundation is "improving the quality of life […] through supporting small business entrepreneurs". Reflecting this objective of the Arthur B. Schultz Foundation, Thriive offers a unique sort of microfinance that not only economically assists small businesses, but also encourages social responsibility. In this type of microfinance no monetary exchange actually takes place. Rather, capital is provided to small businesses in the form of manufacturing equipment. The value of the capital, in turn, is paid for in the form of goods or services to the local community instead of monetarily to the lending organization. As a result, the company can give back to the community both short-term goods and services, as well as long-term employment.

Specifically in the ThriiveCapital Loan Program conducted under the partnership between FHF and Thriive, machinery is provided to budding companies in the city of Huế. The repayments have been in the form of services and goods to other members of the community in need. One of the main recipients of these repayment plans has been the students of poor schools in or around Huế, who were provided with new uniforms, furniture, and school materials.

=== Mending Communities One Stitch at a Time ===
This program is a program in the making, designed to create sustainable economic improvements and promote Vietnamese culture. In order to guarantee long-term success for local businesses and their employees, this program will oversee practices that occur beyond the buying and selling processes:

1. Generate a sound business plan
2. Educate the employees responsible for instructing the artisans in a Train the Trainer
3. Encourage product quality standards
4. Sell and advertise products online
5. Promote saving money for the future in the Match Savings Program
6. Make uniquely Vietnamese style goods
7. Advocate and assist aspiring entrepreneurs

== Health Initiative ==
FHF's health initiative is twofold in that it addresses both immediate medical need and education about healthy habits to ensure improved sanitary standards in the future:

- Health Initiative through Peer Education
- Mobile Clinic Program

=== Health Initiative through Peer Education (HIPE) ===
Financed by the NVIDIA Foundation's High Impact Grant Program, the Health Initiative through Peer Education program aims at educating the people of remote villages in Central Vietnam on personal and environmental sanitation habits, while instilling leadership skills in the children of these communities. In this program, young members of these villages are selected to be trained by FHF staff in order to become HIPE representatives. During the training process, they are taught disease and bacteria prevention methods, as well as the leadership techniques. The representatives then return to their homes to pass on this knowledge and lead the sanitation movement within their respective villages. So far, HIPE has trained 18 health educators and reached 837 students, who were able to score an average of 80% on a basic health questions test.

=== Mobile Clinic Program (MCP) ===
The Mobile Clinic Program provides free medical services for people in poor and distant regions of Huế province. FHF carries out one trip per month, utilizing the medical staff from Huế Central Hospital and Huế Hospital. Each medical mission costs around $350 and serves 250 people on average. Thus far, the MCP has succeeded in seeing more than 26,000 patients and has mobile health clinics in three locations: the Duong Hoa commune, the Huong Phong commune, and the Quang Thanh commune.

== Children's Shelter ==
FHF's Children's Shelter in Xuan Phu, Huế was founded in 2003 for disadvantaged youth and orphans in the Huế province. There are currently 25 children at the shelter who have either been abandoned or whose parents could not afford to provide for them. The children range from ages 7 to 21, and all attend either academic schools or vocational training. They are given the resources and support they need to break out of the cycle of poverty and become contributing members of society. The shelter also puts a great emphasis on the children's development as human beings by providing them with a staff that emotionally supports the children, extracurricular activities, and contact with English speaking volunteers all year round. The volunteers recruited by the Global Volunteers Program work mainly at the shelter and have come from a variety of groups, including volunteers from Monta Vista High School, the French Boy Scouts, Stanford University, Vietnamese Medical Outreach from UC Berkeley, Volunteers in Asia, and Occidental University of Sydney. To date, there have been 20 graduates since the shelter's founding.

== Board members ==
There are five board members, led by chairwoman Jenny Do and executive director Ai Vuong. The other members are Dan Do, Michel Lopez and Linh Vu.
