= 1999 Vietnamese floods =

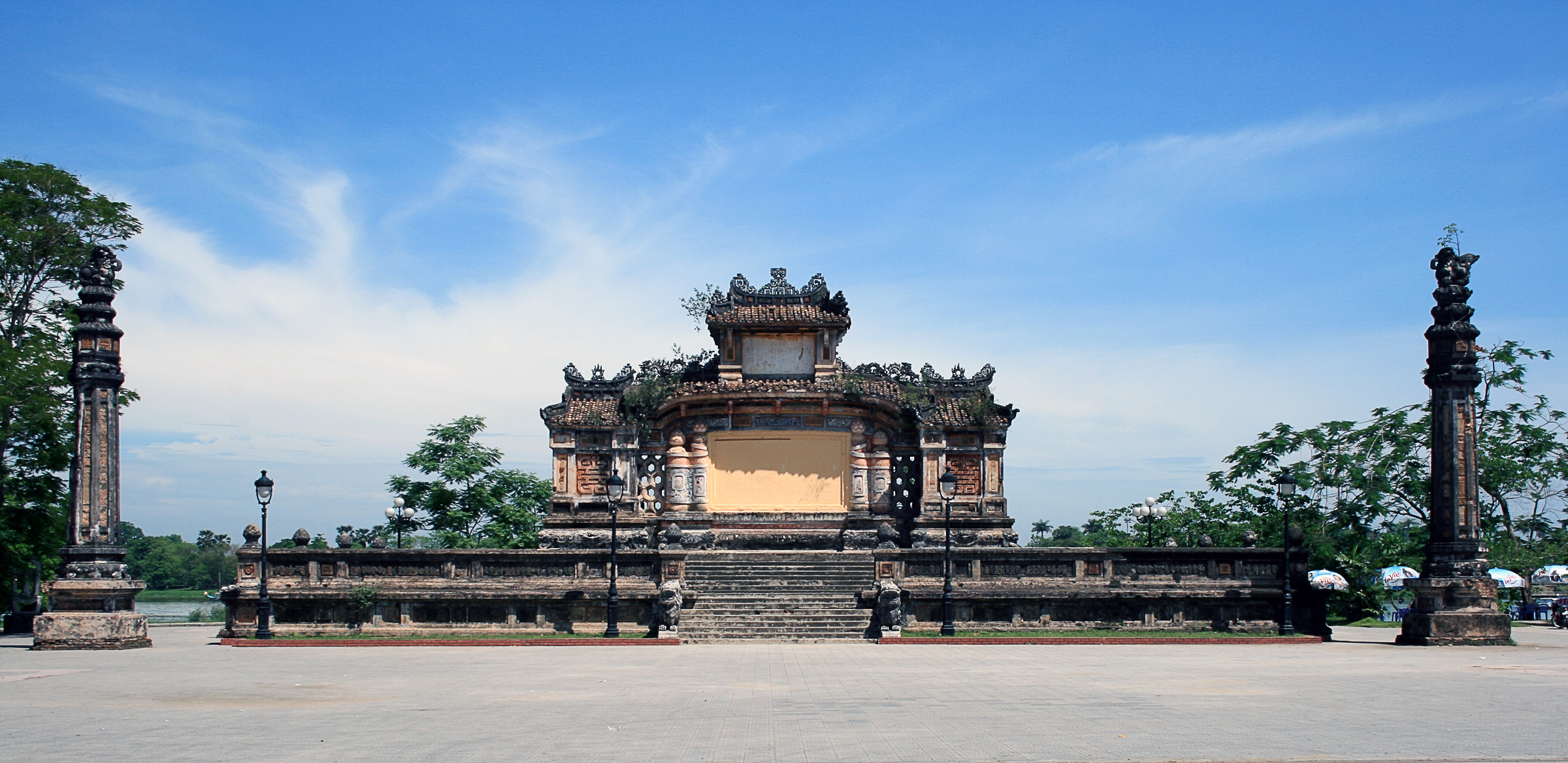
- The Memorial of the Fallen Soldiers in the city of Huế (Quốc học stele), where on November 5, 1999, there were a series of wooden coffins containing the deceased network after the flood 1999.
- Location: Central Vietnam

Meteorological history
- as December Floods
- Formed: October 18, 1999
- Dissipated: November 7, 1999
- Duration: 1 to 6 December 1999

Overall effects
- Fatalities: 622
- Missing: 70
- Damage: $237 million (1999 USD)

The 1999 Vietnamese floods occurred in late October 1999 when Vietnam experienced the worst flooding in forty years. Tropical Storm No. 9, also known as Tropical Storm Eve, first appeared in heavy rain from 18 to 20 October, hitting the central provinces of Quảng Bình, Quảng Trị, Thừa Thiên Huế, Danang, Quảng Nam in Vietnam. The rain was the first in a series of rainstorm events that lasted for two to three weeks.

== Background ==
Vietnam is a Southeast Asian country with a subtropical climate in the north and a tropical climate in the central and southern regions, which are easily influenced by monsoons. The southwest monsoon from May to October each year brings a large amount of rainfall to the exposed areas, namely the north and south. According to Visual Capitalist, Vietnam ranks third globally in terms of the proportion of people most at risk of flooding, with 46% of its 98 million population at risk of flooding.

Vietnam is a country with severe flood disasters. Rainfall, tides, storms, and tropical depressions are natural factors that cause floods. Due to Vietnam's abundant rainfall, with an average annual rainfall of 1,500 to 2,500 millimetres, heavy rain often leads to flooding in cities with poor drainage systems.

The Tropical Storm Eve, locally known as Storm No. 9 (Vietnamese: Bão số 9) caused dangerous (Level II) and extremely dangerous (Level III) floods in several major river basins in central provinces. As of 7:00 am on 20 October, the rainfall in the above-mentioned provinces ranged from 100 millimetres to 470 millimetres, exceeding the monthly average level.

As of 1 November, the rivers from Phú Yên to Bình Định exceeded the Level III warning. The continuous floods, combined with landslides, caused serious damage to roads, dams, and infrastructure. At the flood peak, the heavily-affected Hue streets in then-Thừa Thiên Huế Province (now Huế city) was flooded with up to three meters of water, and telecommunications services in that area and other parts of the eight central provinces were suspended.

From 1 to 3 November, under the influence of a strong cold surge and tropical activities, the central provinces from Quảng Bình to Bình Định experienced heavy to extremely heavy rainfall. The combined effect of the South China Sea low pressure zone and the tail of the cold front caused a short-term concentrated rainstorm. Some mountainous areas in Quảng Nam and Thừa Thiên Huế Provinces experienced flash floods, and serious flooding occurred on the riverbanks from Quảng Nam to Bình Định.

The rainfall lasted for seven consecutive days from 1 to 7 November. Due to the large range, concentration of rainfall, 90% of the hilly areas were flooded quickly. The water level of Perfume River and Bo River, the two major rivers in Huế, sometimes rose to 8-9m.

As of 7 November, temporary statistical data provided by the Central Committee for Flood and Storm Control (CCFSC), a UNDP sponsored program for disaster monitoring in Vietnam, it was estimated that the two week flood had caused more than 500 deaths, and people's communication, transportation, and housing were severely affected by the floods.

== Impact ==
=== Human casualties & displacement ===
As of 14 November, according to the Government of Vietnam, the following figures were reported: 622 fatalities, 70 individuals missing, and a need for relief assistance for over 1 million people. According to provisional data from the Vietnamese CCFSC among the fatalities, 324 resided in Thừa Thiên Huế province, while on 9 November it was reported that 15,000 people had to evacuate. Total damage across the nation reached 3.3 trillion đồng (US$237 million).

=== Health ===
The damage to transportation routes due to the floods limited access to medical care, with 510 health clinics already being reported battered. This disruption in health services potentially worsened existing health conditions and impeded immediate medical attention. Polluted river water remained a persistent health concern, aggravated by the lack of clean water systems. The risk of a communicable disease outbreak, specifically those transmitted via faecal - oral routes, had risen significantly in flooded regions, due to limited access to clean drinking water and the environmental contamination in the water resources. According to reports from local media a rash of illnesses, including dengue fever, diarrhoea, flu, eye infections and respiratory problems, had spread to five of the eight coastal districts devastated by the floods. Specifically, 9,862 cases of eye infections were reported, 9,347 cases of diarrhoea, 1,096 cases of dysentery, and 16,460 cases of flu. These figures demonstrate the severe impact and underscore the importance of implementing robust flood prevention measures in flood-prone regions, emphasising the necessity of medical knowledge and enhanced support both during and after floods.

The local population faced significant health risks, including psychological conditions, stemming from anxiety and the abrupt disturbance of their well-being, which may persist years beyond the receding floodwaters. The shortage of findings about the effects of the floods on mental health reveals that conditions like anxiety and post-traumatic stress disorder (PTSD) remained neglected.

=== Housing, infrastructure & education ===
The Government of Vietnam reported that more than 470,493 households were impacted, with 41,846 homes completely destroyed and 870,000 homes sustaining damage. The flooding experience proved most distressing for the lowland residents, particularly for those who had nowhere to seek refuge when the water levels surged, reaching the rooftops of their homes. Intense winds generated fierce waves, complicating movement.

According to a report published by the UN Office for the Coordination of Humanitarian Affairs, sections of National Highway One, vital for connecting Hanoi and Ho Chi Minh City, remained inaccessible for days after the flooding, as did extensive stretches of the north-south railway. Damaged roads resulted in the isolation of three inland districts within Thừa Thiên Huế. Erosion rendered 11 villages in two districts practically isolating them as if they were islands. A total of 267 kilometres of roadway and 5,416 meters of water resource conduits and transportation dykes incurred substantial damage.

Despite significant material damage, including reports of 94,000 shattered classrooms, education remained remarkably resilient, as the majority of families persisted in enrolling their children in school, despite encountering economic challenges.

=== Food security ===
Food security improved in Vietnam during the 1990s before the floods. Poorer households heavily dependent on energy from carbohydrates, such as rice, increased their calorific intake but still lacked iron, calcium and vitamins whilst richer households improved the quality of what they consumed. This was a result of economic growth resulting in a decrease in food insecurity across the population. Yet in 1998, roughly 80% of the poor worked in agriculture. This meant that most lived in isolated, rural areas or areas prone to disasters with undeveloped infrastructure where food insecurity was higher. Consequently, the 1999 floods resulted in widespread food shortages for over 1 million people, particularly those living in isolated, rural areas dependent on rice as a staple. This resulted in not enough nutrients being consumed impacting children from rural and poor households the most since they were already suffering from malnutrition.

The floods destroyed 11,813 ha of paddy fields and damaged 63,726 ha of paddy fields, with further damage to 30,985 ha of other crops (sugarcane, manioc, maize, sweet potatoes, and nuts). A further 205,000 tons of food rotted, including staples such as rice which accounts for 85% of Vietnam's grain harvest and 120,000 tons of rice seed was contaminated. An estimated 693,154 livestock was also lost, including an estimated 25,000 cows and buffaloes, with surviving livestock potentially succumbing to epidemics that follow floods.

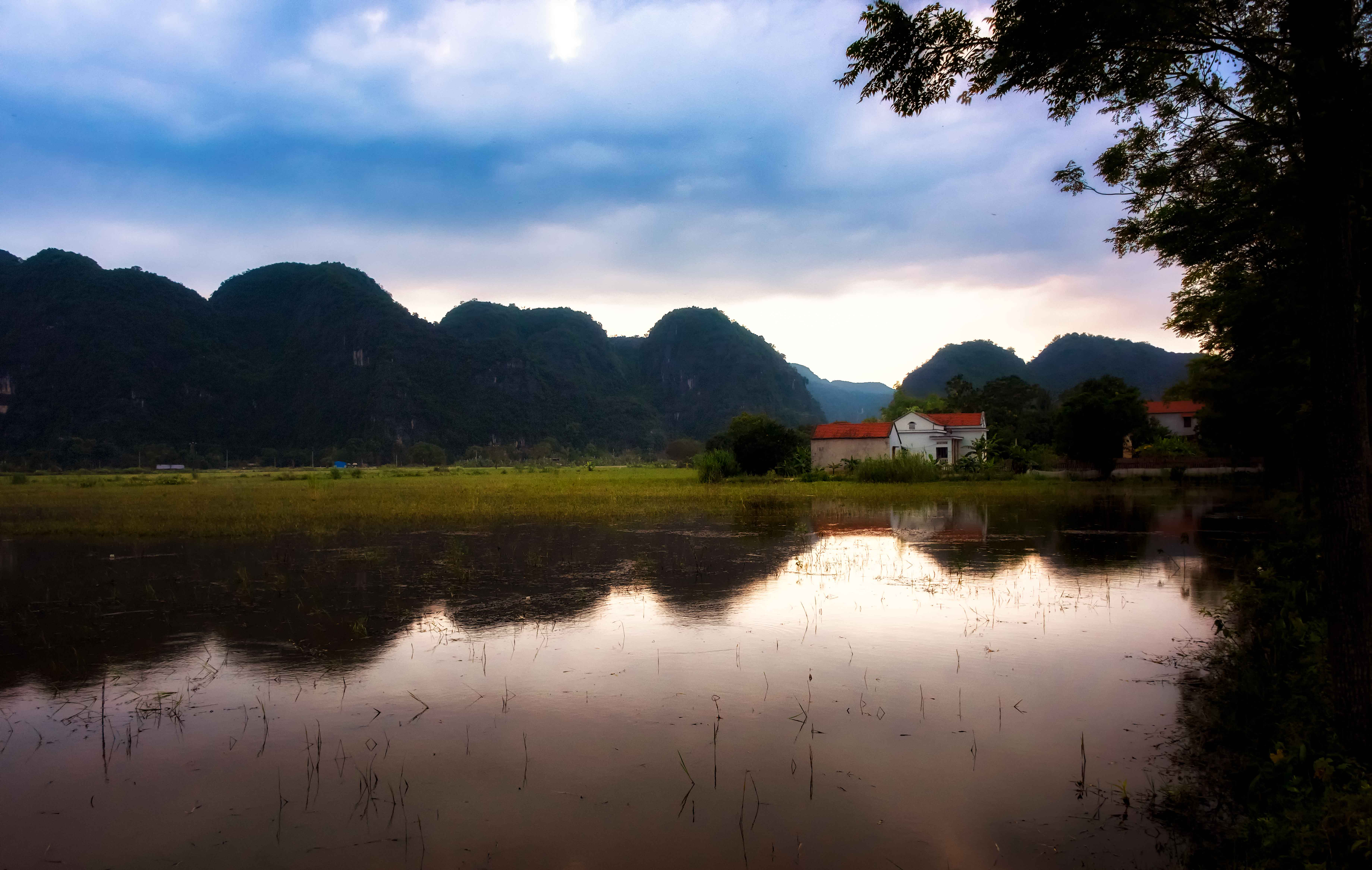
A rice farm in Vietnam

Isolated villages began to run out of food by 4 November with bad weather preventing food being airlifted. Hong Ha was one of the villages that did not have community food stocks due to a lack of surplus crops. This resulted in many families experiencing hunger when floodwaters destroyed their crops because food assistance did not arrive in Hong Ha until one week after the floods. Food donations throughout Vietnam collected 100 tons of food by 10 November and Thừa Thiên Huế received a further 200 tons of food.

Rice aid was initially distributed equally to households experiencing food insecurity. Further rice deliveries were distributed based on household categorisation determined by how badly the flood had impacted them. Between 150 and 250 kg of rice was provided to each household and lasted two to three months. Vegetable and bean seeds were provided by the Hue University of Agriculture and Forestry and many lowland households borrowed rice from neighbours with the intention of repaying after the next harvest. Once the rice aid was finished, households also lent and gave food to each other.

After the floods had subsided, due to the impact on crops, livestock and farmers, food security continued to be an issue for 80% of people living in the flooded region. The significant damage to paddy fields resulted in the winter-spring crop not being planted until March 2000. This resulted in a late harvest in October during the midst of the monsoon season in the central regions. Many poor households lost their main food source and income until the next harvest but only 1% of official development assistance (ODA) was spent on food and emergency relief in 2000, with healthcare spending equating to US$19 per capita. There is an absence of data comparing food security between urban and rural areas. However, the poverty rate stagnated and the percentage of people suffering from food insecurity and undernutrition overall increased due to insufficient consumption of food.

Poverty rates and food insecurity
	1998	1999	2000	2001	2002	2004
Poverty rate (percentage of population under $5.50 per day)	89	89	89	89	88.9	84.2
Food insecurity (percentage of population)	15	-	-	19.7	18	15.7
Urban	2.5	-	-	-	-	-
Rural	18.6	-	-	-	-	-

== National response ==
Following the first flood on 2 November, Vietnam's Prime Minister requested through an Instruction Telegram, the urgent implementation of preparedness and response plans and emergency relief from the Provincial People's Committees. In conformance with the Prime Minister's Instruction No. 7/1999/CT-TT on flood preparedness, established in May 1999, all branches and levels deployed active plans against natural calamity including the identification of evacuation sites. The Government deployed a Special Mission to monitor the affected area to monitor the response activities. Residents were advised to evacuate on the first day of the flood by commune CCFSC officials who issued warnings by bells, loudspeakers, and radio. Residents started to evacuate using small rowboats and rafts.

=== Transportation ===
The Ministry of Defence mobilised forces and transportation means to transport aid commodities to the affected areas and rescue stranded residents. Twenty-four army planes, 280 trucks, two information-monitoring cars, two switchboard cars and other means of transportation were mobilised to support emergency relief. The forces cleared air and land transportation, and with the support of other Ministries and Sectors who quickly prepared materials and food, they transported:

1. 800 tons of aid commodities to the affected areas including noodles, life buoys, clothes, medicines, blankets, mosquito nets and other commodities.
2. 33,000 tons of food-stock from the National Reserve Source.

The forces and local people, rescued 600 people caught in the flood, transported 28,000 people away from the disaster zone, and provided commodities and food to 1 million people. Rescue activities and commodities supply were supported by the transportation sector, which repaired the roads and rail infrastructure from the North to the South, which had been blocked for many days. In addition, air bridges were set up across the country and flights were resumed in accordance with weather conditions.

Food supply and evacuation to villages was challenging due to bad weather conditions that prevented airlifting. On 6 November, improved weather allowed access for emergency aid from working groups and armed forces.

=== Healthcare ===
The sector's emergency Health Care Network was immediately implemented, providing medicine and water-filtering chemicals to the affected areas. Doctors and nurses were transported to the disaster zone to provide emergency support to flood victims.

=== Media and communication ===
The catastrophic flood was quickly communicated through the radio and television, initiating support from the public. The Standing Office of CCFSC and the Hydro-Meteorology Service also supported communication between localities and sectors.

== International responses ==
The Red Cross-National Society in Vietnam (VNRC), assisted by the country, provided support and manpower in flood emergency relief. The VNRC supported by the International Federation was active in assisting the evacuation and relief distribution, using its own resources and US$50,000 from the Federation's Disaster Relief Emergency (DREF). The second phase of the Red Cross emergency response included the procurement of rice, blankets, mosquito nets and household utensils. Red Cross volunteers also helped to collect the dead and livestock to prevent the outbreak of post-flood diseases, as well as transported instant noodles and communications equipment to the affected communities. The public also supported Red Cross by providing hundreds of tons of food and clothing. The VNRC assisted with extensive media coverage both in Vietnam and internationally, communicating the huge magnitude of the flood disaster.

The Central Committee for Flood and Storm Control (CCFSC) in coordination with relevant Ministries, was requested to immediately provide emergency support on the 3 November. The CCFSC created initial damage reports, financially supported the emergency relief by releasing US$8,000 of their emergency funds, and assisted in distributing rice, household items and reconstruction kits for affected families.

The US airlifted 20 tons of emergency relief materials including plastic sheeting, water containers, blankets and temporary storage. The US also pledged US$450,000 to the Federation for household kits to the affected families and eight public health professionals arrived in Vietnam to conduct health assessments.

Financial help to flood victims in Vietnam was provided by several countries, including France, Thailand, Malaysia, Australia, Hong Kong, China, and the EU countries. Specifically, US$2.4 million was received for the US$3.1 million Red Cross appeal.

== Aftermath ==
=== December floods ===
Less than four weeks following the dissipation of the November rainstorm, central Vietnam again experienced heavy rainfall with extensive flooding, just as relief efforts were underway. From 1 to 6 December, rain in mountainous regions caused flash floods and blocked main travel routes, with areas of the National Highway No.1 up to 1.7 metres underwater and part of the north-south railway obstructed. The provinces of Quảng Ngãi, Bình Định and Quảng Nam were most devastated by the December floods.

The need for emergency relief was imperative, particularly as seeds for rice and vegetables that had been distributed in earlier aid efforts were destroyed by further flooding and therefore in significantly short supply. Over US$450,000 in relief was distributed by the Vietnamese Red Cross following the December floods.

As of 8 December 1999, there were 132 fatalities and 432,696 houses destroyed or swept away by rainwater as a result of the December floods.

=== Reconstruction and adaptations ===
The Catholic Relief Services alongside the People's Committee of Thừa Thiên Huế signed a Memorandum of Understanding in which they pledged to build approximately 120 houses in the Quảng Trị province. As of September 2000, forty-three houses had been built in the Ma Ne Village, thirty houses in the Phuoc Loc Village and Hai Duong Commune and sixty-four houses in the Hai Hoa Commune. Additionally a school was built in the Phuoc Loc Village as several educational institutions were destroyed during the floods. The commune's People Committee and the district Education Section worked together to finance the repair of school buildings.

Individuals commonly took out loans to secure housing and prevent further vulnerability. Those from rural households, who often had less stable income, found it easier to access private loans with higher interest rates; they then experienced difficulty with repayments when production, and therefore income, post-flood remained unstable. The Government, Red Cross and non-governmental organisations provided housing assistance to the poorest households.

Due to frequent flooding in central Vietnam, housing adaptations have been undertaken in affected areas to prevent the replication of the devastation caused by the 1999 floods. A field study in Vân Quật Đông in central Vietnam noted that houses built after the 1999 floods had noticeably higher elevated foundations compared with those built prior to 1999. However, more effective flood prevention measures for housebuilding, such as two-storey houses made of durable material, is often too expensive for villagers and therefore they remain vulnerable to the effects of flooding.

=== Health and well-being ===
There is little documentation about the improvement of water sanitation post-flood following the initiation of water purification processes. It is therefore unknown if there were any long-term health consequences due to contaminated water.

Those most affected by floods in Vietnam are usually from poorer households, due to reliance on weather for income, less secure housing and longer recovery periods due to less savings and insurance. Additionally, the primary care system within areas most frequently affected by flooding in Vietnam does not have the capacity to respond to and treat flood-related issues.

Following the 1999 floods there were calls to strengthen local and national policies, particularly the health response in rural communities. When central Vietnam was hit by floods again in 2020, the Government released a response plan and demonstrated effective management, showing improvement in the country's response since 1999. It is recognised that in future years responding to climate change will be the priority of Vietnam's disaster management policy.

== See also ==
- Friends of Hue Foundation
