= 1931 Pacific typhoon season =

Seasonal boundaries
- First system formed: December 29, 1930
- Last system dissipated: November 23, 1931

Strongest storm
- Name: "Shanghai"
  - Lowest pressure: 959 hPa (mbar)

Seasonal statistics
- Total depressions: 30
- Typhoons: 19
- Total fatalities: 300,349
- Total damage: Unknown

Related articles
- 1931 Atlantic hurricane season; 1931 Pacific hurricane season; 1930s North Indian Ocean cyclone seasons

There were 30 tropical cyclones in the western Pacific Ocean in 1931, including 19 typhoons, as well as one that developed in December of the previous year. The most significant typhoon was one that struck eastern China near Shanghai in the midst of the country's worst floods on record; heavy rainfall caused levees to collapse along the Grand Canal, killing an estimated 300,000 people, including about 2,000 people overnight in the city of Gaoyou.

== Storms ==
=== January–July ===
On December 30, a tropical cyclone formed south of Guam and proceeded westward. A day later, the system passed near Yap. On January 2, the typhoon moved through the southern Philippines, crossing Leyte, the Camotes Islands, northern Cebu, northern Negros Island, and central Panay. While the storm was nearby, Dumalag, Capiz recorded a minimum pressure of 983 mbar (29.02 inHg). Winds in Cebu reached 118.7 km/h (73.8 mph). The typhoon weakened in the South China Sea on January 5–6. Across the archipelago, the typhoon sank two ships, left thousands homeless, and killed at least 31 people. Damage in the Philippines totaled about 6 million pesos, spurring the Governor-general to ask residents for money for a special typhoon fund. The American Red Cross donated about 20,000 pesos to assist in recovery.

A depression formed northwest of Guam on May 6. It moved generally northward, passing west of the Bonin Islands before curving to the northeast. It was last observed on May 8.

A typhoon formed in the South China Sea on June 4. It moved to the north-northeast and passed near the east coast of Taiwan. The storm crossed the northern Ryukyu Islands and was last observed on June 9.

Another typhoon formed in the East China Sea on June 11. The storm moved in a general northeast direction, passing over the northern Ryukyu Islands. It was last observed on June 14.

A tropical cyclone originated in the South China Sea on July 10. A day later, the storm moved over southeastern China.

Another tropical cyclone was first observed over the open Pacific on July 16. It moved to the northwest and struck eastern China near Shanghai; it was last noted on July 18.

A depression existed east of the Philippines on July 29. Steered by a ridge to the north over Japan, the system moved northwestward, brushing the northern tip of Luzon before entering the South China Sea. Early on August 1, a station on Pratas Island recorded a minimum pressure of 988 mbar (29.2 inHg) while the typhoon passed nearby. As the storm approached southeastern China, the Hong Kong Observatory issued a Number 10 warning signal, which is the highest level of warning; this marked the first occasion that the agency issued a Number 10 warning since adopting a new system in the previous year. Late on August 1, the typhoon made landfall between Hong Kong and Macau, and weakened over land by the next day. High waves damaged the end of the first Queen's Pier, and sank four ships. Wind gusts in the colony reached 218 km/h (135 mph). The high winds destroyed the roofs of several buildings, completely wrecking four homes. There were six deaths in Hong Kong, as well as four injuries.

=== August ===
From August 3–5, a short-lived tropical cyclone existed south of Japan; the storm moved northwestward toward the Ryukyu Islands before recurving to the northeast.

A typhoon was first observed on August 5 south of Guam. The storm moved to the west and later northwest, recurved to the northeast, and then turned back to the northwest, steered by a ridge to its north. The track brought the typhoon over the southern Ryukyu Islands, where the typhoon wrecked about 10,000 houses, decimated crops, and killed 15 people. Ishigaki Island recorded a minimum pressure of 986 mbar (29.1 inHg). The typhoon then passed north of Taiwan, producing estimated winds of 160 km/h (99 mph). The storm struck mainland China between Fuzhou and Wenzhou on August 11, eventually weakening over Guizhou province in central China. The schooner 'Kwongsang, bound from Shanghai to Shantou, foundered in the typhoon with 57 people on board, and only four survivors. Several other ships were damaged.

From August 7–12, a low pressure area persisted in the South China Sea, bringing heavy rainfall to the Philippines. Over a nine-day period, the system dropped 1,036.5 mm (40.81 in) of rainfall in Manila, which caused the worst flooding in the city in 26 years, in conjunction with above normal tides. This left around 4,000 people homeless. The system moved northward through the South China Sea and began intensifying on August 12. Three days later, the system strengthened into a typhoon and passed near Pratas, which recorded a minimum pressure of 986 mbar (29.1 inHg). On August 17, the typhoon moved ashore southern China between Hong Kong and Shantou, and gradually weakened over land, dissipating by August 20.

On August 9, a tropical cyclone began developing between the Caroline Islands and the Marianas Islands. For several days, the track was uncertain, until a more steady northwest trajectory began on August 15. The storm crossed the Ryukyu Islands on August 17, and later turned to the northeast in the Yellow Sea. The storm moved across the Korean Peninsula, and dissipated on August 19.

==== Shanghai typhoon ====
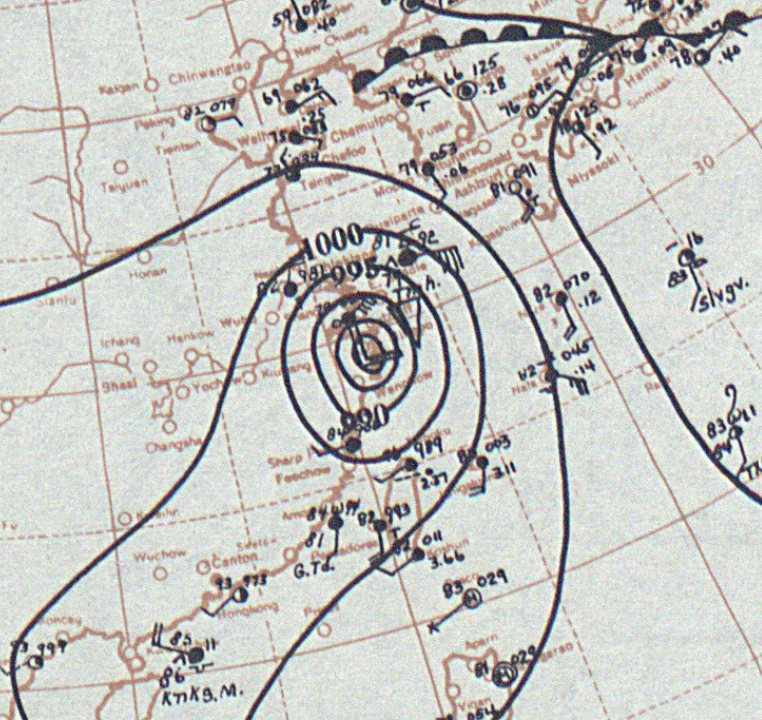
Surface weather analysis of the Shanghai typhoon on 25 August

A tropical cyclone began developing between Yap and Guam on August 14. It drifted northward initially, and later began a west-northwest track on August 19. The typhoon curved back to the northwest, striking Okinawa on August 24. A station in Naha recorded a minimum pressure of 963 mbar (28.4 inHg). After crossing the East China Sea, the typhoon curved to the north and struck China's east coast near Ningbo on August 25. The storm passed east of Shanghai, bringing estimated winds of 160 km/h (99 mph) to the city. The SS President Cleveland rode out the typhoon along the Huangpu River, and recorded a pressure of 966 mbar (28.5 inHg). After affecting China, the typhoon recurved to the northeast, moving across the Yellow Sea, the northern Korean Peninsula, the Sea of Japan, and eventually the La Pérouse Strait. The typhoon was last observed on August 28.

In Shanghai, high winds knocked down hundreds of trees. Ahead of the typhoon, heavy rainfall across China led to the deadliest floods worldwide in the 20th century, with large areas flooded along the country's major rivers. On August 26, wind-generated waves from the typhoon broke the walls of the levees along Gaoyou Lake. There were 15 breaks in levees along the Grand Canal, inundating a 25,900 km^{2} (10,000 mi^{2}) portion of northern Jiangsu, including 80 towns, killing 300,000 people, according to contemporaneous news reports. In the city of Gaoyou, the levee break killed 2,000 people in the middle of the night. In 2005, the 1931 Gaoyou Flood museum opened, featuring aerial photographs of the floods, taken by Charles Lindbergh. In Korea, the typhoon killed 40 people, with 770 fishermen reported missing after the storm's passage.

=== September ===
On September 1, a tropical cyclone was first observed near the southern China coast. The system moved westward, crossing Hong Kong into mainland China on September 3. In Hong Kong, the typhoon produced wind gusts of 151 km/h (94 mph) and a minimum pressure of 986 mbar (29.1 inHg). The system moved inland and was last noted over Jiangxi on September 11.

A tropical cyclone formed west of Guam on September 2, embarking on a west-northwest direction. On September 10, the typhoon moved through the southern Ryukyu Islands into the East China, where it turned to the northeast. The storm struck the Japanese island of Kyushu. The storm later crossed the Korea Strait into the Sea of Japan, where it killed at least 100 fishermen after their boats capsized. The storm was last noted on September 13 after passing near northern Japan.

A tropical cyclone existed from September 7–9, originating northeast of Philippines and moving in a northeast direction. Possibly related to the storm is a typhoon that struck the Patrick Henry ship to the southeast of Tokyo, which recorded a pressure of 959 mbar (28.3 inHg). The storm was last noted on September 12.

On September 16, a storm developed in the East China Sea. It moved in a northeast direction, and was last noted on September 20.

On September 18, a tropical cyclone originated east of the Philippines. The typhoon moved westward, striking Samar two days after its formation. Daet, Camarines Norte recorded a pressure of 975 mbar (28.8 inHg), the lowest recorded in the Philippine archipelago. The typhoon turned to the north, striking eastern Luzon on September 21, and Taiwan on September 23. It accelerated to the northeast, moving across western Japan and Sakhalin; the once powerful typhoon was last noted on September 28. Newspapers described the death toll from "over 100" to "over 1,000", with 1,346 houses and 203 boats wrecked in the Tokyo area.

=== October ===
A tropical cyclone formed near the Macclesfield Bank on October 1. It moved generally to the northwest in the South China Sea, and was last noted on October 4 south of Hainan.

From October 3–7, a tropical cyclone existed east of the Philippines, which remained over water for its entire existence.

On October 5, a tropical cyclone originated south of Guam. The typhoon moved in a general northwest trajectory for about a week, recurving to the northeast after October 12. It moved across central Japan, bringing heavy rainfall and high winds that caused loss of life. The typhoon was last noted on October 14.

A tropical cyclone of typhoon intensity existed in the South China Sea on October 9. Moving northwest, the typhoon struck central Vietnam on October 11.

On October 13, a tropical cyclone originated between Yap and Guam. The system moved westward and later northwestward, passing to the north of Luzon, where heavy rainfall caused the worst flooding in Aparri in 23 years, as well as flooding in Cagayan Valley. A ship in San Vincente reported a minimum pressure of 975 mbar (28.8 inHg), indicating typhoon intensity. On October 20, the storm weakened and dissipated in the South China Sea.

A depression originated northeast of Yap on October 20. It moved to the northwest for four days and later recurved to the northeast while at typhoon intensity. The storm washed a ship was ashore the Bonin Islands. The typhoon was last observed on October 27 to the east of Japan.

=== November ===
As early as November 3, a tropical cyclone developed north of Yap. The storm moved westward and later northwestward as it approached the Philippines, moving across the northern Philippines on November 7. A ship in Infanta on Luzon's west coast reported a pressure of 976 mbar (28.8 inHg), indicating typhoon intensity. The storm continued across the South China Sea and was last noted southeast of Hainan on November 10.

Another tropical cyclone developed in the same area as the previous storm on November 6–7. After the storm moved westward, its trajectory turned to the northwest. On November 10, the typhoon struck eastern Luzon south of Echague, where a ship reported a pressure of 977 mbar (28.9 inHg). The storm tracked across the South China Sea and moved ashore China east of Hong Kong on November 12.

On November 13, a tropical cyclone was observed to the east of Luzon. The storm moved to the northwest, turned to the north on November 15, and recurved to the northeast. It was last observed on November 18.

A tropical cyclone developed south of Guam on November 16. It moved westward for a few days, but gradually curved to the north and northeast. A station on Oaogarizima reported a pressure of 985 mbar (29.1 inHg), indicating typhoon intensity. It was last observed on November 24.

=== December ===
On December 3, a tropical cyclone originated southeast of Yap. The storm moved to the northwest, and later the west. On December 5, the typhoon struck the eastern Philippines near Catbalogan on Samar; a station there reported a pressure of 979 mbar (28.9 inHg). In Catbalogan, the typhoon killed two people and wrecked more than 100 houses. The typhoon later passed near Capiz and Culion. While moving through the Philippines, the storm washed two boats ashore. The storm was last observed on December 8.

Another tropical cyclone, possibly related to the former one, was observed in the South China Sea on December 7 near the Paracel Islands. It moved northwest at first, and later turned to the northeast, dissipating on December 9 north of Pratas Island.

A depression emerged from China into the Yellow Sea on December 8. It moved across the Korean Peninsula, the Sea of Japan, and eastward into the Pacific; it was last noted on December 10. Another depression existed from December 9–10, which moved in an northeasterly direction from the East China Sea. The final depression of the season formed east of the Ryukyu Islands on December 11. It tracked northeastward and was last observed on December 13.
