= List of Pacific typhoons before 1850 =

This article documents Pacific typhoon seasons that occurred during the middle of 19th century and earlier.

The list is very incomplete; information on early typhoon seasons is patchy and relies heavily on individual observations of travellers and ships. There were no comprehensive records kept by a central organisation at this early time.

== Meteorology ==
Tropical cyclones tend to form in the northwestern Pacific Ocean between May and December. These dates conventionally delimit the period of each year when most tropical cyclones form in the northwestern Pacific Ocean.

The scope of this article is limited to the Pacific Ocean, north of the equator and west of the International Date Line in Oceania East Asia and The Indian Ocean.

Storms that form in the Pacific east of the date line and north of the equator in Australia (Oceania Continent), North America, Central America, and northwest South America are called Pacific hurricanes Storms that form in the Pacific south of the equator in Southern Australia (Oceania Continent), Maritime Southeast Asia, and western South America are called South Pacific tropical cyclone. or [[Pacific typhoons]]

== Historical typhoons ==
=== Pre-1200s ===
==== China (Song Dynasty) ====
On September 3, 251 AD, a typhoon struck Haining, causing floods with a depth of about 2 m (6.6 ft). On September 7, 256, a typhoon struck Suzhou and Huzhou. A strong wind uprooted trees, and the water of Lake Tai overflowed, causing flooding with a depth of approximately 2 m on the plains. In 748, a typhoon in the East China Sea led to the failure of Jianzhen's fifth attempt to sail to Japan. A likely typhoon struck Guangling, Yangzhou in 751, sinking thousands of ships and boats in the Yangtze River estuary. Another probable typhoon produced strong winds in Guangdong in August 798, damaging buildings and capsizing boats. The first officially registered typhoon impact in China happened in 816, when city walls were damaged in Gaomi, Shandong Province. Another typhoon struck present-day Guangdong Province in April or May 819, and was recorded in a poem by Han Yu. A typhoon struck Huzhou in 822. Another typhoon struck Huzhou in 824. In 957, a powerful typhoon struck near Hong Kong, killing at least 10,000 people. In November 975, a typhoon struck the city of Guangzhou.

==== Japan (Nippon) ====
A typhoon struck the Kumano Region (the southern portion of Wakayama and Mie Prefectures) and destroyed swaths of woodland on September 8, 473 AD. This is one of, if not the, earliest recorded instance of an individual typhoon in Japanese history. While earlier records (e.g., during the reigns of Emperors Jimmu and Keikō) do depict similar storm events, the emperors themselves are largely considered to be legendary figures and their records unreliable.

In 701, typhoons and locust swarms devastated harvests across Japan. A typhoon in October 753 killed at least 560 people in Settsu Province. A typhoon in September 759 lashed Kyushu with strong winds, destroying houses and government buildings. Several typhoons struck Japan and damaged rice crops in the early 770s. A typhoon affected the Tōkai region, particularly the provinces of Ise, Mino, and Owari in September 775. A typhoon caused floods in Chikugo Province in September 796. A powerful typhoon struck Settsu Province in September 817, producing storm surges in Osaka Bay, which killed 220 people. A typhoon struck Kyoto in August 819, June 836, and July 847. A likely typhoon caused severe flooding along the Yodo River around Osaka in September 848. A typhoon affected Kyoto in June 850. A powerful typhoon struck Kyushu in June 858, razing buildings to the ground and decimating crops. A typhoon hit Kyoto in July 859. Two typhoons struck the Kinki region in August and October 860. A typhoon struck Kyoto in July 865. A strong typhoon impacted Higo Province in August 869, causing extensive damage and loss of life. A typhoon in October 874 caused the Kamo and Katsura Rivers to overflow and wreaked havoc across the Kyoto area. A typhoon affected Kyoto in August 875, July 899, and June 910. A typhoon struck Japan in September 913. A typhoon hit Kyoto in June 916. A powerful typhoon rolled through central Japan in September 944. A typhoon struck Kyoto in July 947, July 957, and August 961. A typhoon affected Nara and surrounding regions in October 962. A typhoon struck Kyoto in July 966. An early-season typhoon struck Kyoto in June 973. A typhoon affected Kyoto in July 976. A destructive typhoon struck Kii Province in October 988. (Note: "Eien 2, 13th day of the eighth month" (永延2年8月13日), which corresponds to 1 October 988 (Gregorian) or 26 September 988 (Julian). One of the sources has a typographical error and states the date as "Eien 2, 31st day of the eighth month" (永延2年8月31日), which does not exist (the eighth month of Eien 2 (988) has only 30 days).)

In September 989, a powerful typhoon known as Eiso-no-Kaze ("Storm of Eiso era") in Japan, possibly similar to the infamous 1934 Muroto typhoon in track and intensity, struck Kyoto and caused severe damage in Heian-kyō and across Japan, destroying numerous buildings and killing many, which was described as an "unprecedented disaster" in a historical text. Strong winds damaged vegetation as far as Echigo Province (modern-day Niigata Prefecture). Following the calamity, the era name was changed from Eiso to Shōryaku in December 990.

A typhoon affected Kyoto in July 1005, August 1009, July 1012, and June 1015. Kyoto was struck by a typhoon in November 1019, the only known storm to affect the area in November in the 9th–11th centuries. A typhoon was observed in Kyoto in August 1020 and July 1023. Three typhoons battered the Kinki region in September 1028, including one on 28 September that submerged the easternmost part of Heian-kyō near Kamo River. A very destructive typhoon struck Kyoto in September 1034, reportedly comparable to the 989 typhoon. A typhoon swept through Japan in September 1092, causing deadly floods and storm surges. A typhoon affected Kyoto in August 1095. A typhoon in September 1097 that killed a large number of peasants was named as one of the reasons for the era change from Eichō to Jōtoku. An unusually early typhoon struck Kyoto in May 1111. Another typhoon affected Kyoto in August 1113. A typhoon struck Kyoto in September 1115, causing extensive floods. Typhoons affected Kyoto in August and October 1117. A typhoon affected Kyoto in August 1119, August 1125, August 1131, and July 1134. Two typhoons struck Kyoto in 1144, one in July and one in August. A typhoon was recorded in Kyoto in August 1151 and August 1159. Two typhoons affected Kyoto in August 1176. In 1177, two typhoons were recorded in Kyoto: one in July and one in mid-November—remarkably late for a typhoon in Japan—that likely flooded parts of Heian-kyō. Two typhoons struck Kyoto in June and July 1182. A typhoon struck Kyoto in July 1187.

=== 1200–1599 ===
==== China/Yuan dynasty (1271–1368), Ming dynasty (1368–1644) ====
A powerful typhoon struck Hong Kong in 1245, killing around 10,000 people. A typhoon struck Shanghai in August 1301 (Note: Date converted from Chinese calendar (same goes for all old Chinese storms).) and brought severe storm surges, drowning over 17,000+ people. Another typhoon in 1372 killed more than 10,000 in Shanghai. A typhoon struck Fujian in September 1380 that dropped torrential rains in the area and claimed many lives. In August 1390, a devastating typhoon inundated the coasts near Shanghai. 1,700 families were wiped out in the submerged states, 70-80% of the population along the Chongming coast drowned, and over 20,000 people died in Songjiang Prefecture (Note: Chinese: 松江府, which encompassed much of present-day Shanghai; Not to be confused with Songjiang District, a district of Shanghai the prefecture was centered in.) alone.

A typhoon struck Shanghai in 1444, during which the ground was submerged in over 10 feet (3 m) of water. A typhoon in August 1461 produced 10-foot storm surges, which killed over 12,500 people. The Shanghai area was again inundated with more than 10 feet of water during a typhoon in 1472. A violent typhoon struck Quanzhou in August 1493, destroying most buildings in the city as well as countless ships. In July 1509, a typhoon affected Shanghai and flooded the city, which, combined with the following three years of severe floods and cold winters, left tens of thousands to starve. Waters surged and tens of thousands of houses were swept away in a typhoon that impacted Shanghai in August 1539, which left a great famine and epidemic in its wake. A typhoon at the end of July 1582 claimed 20,000 lives and destroyed hundreds of square kilometers of crops in Suzhou and Songjiang. Two typhoons struck the Shanghai region in 1591; one that caused severe flooding between late July and mid-August killed tens of thousands; and the other in early September raised tides by 14–15 ft (4.3–4.6 m), washed away thousands of homes, and killed another 20,000.

==== Japan (Nippon) ====
A pair of fierce typhoons struck the Kanto region in September 1201, inflicting severe damage to buildings and crops. A typhoon affected Kyoto in August 1206. Six successive typhoons struck Japan between August and October 1207, wreaking havoc in Kyoto and Kamakura, which, combined with a smallpox epidemic, prompted another era change from Ken'ei to Jōgen in November. A typhoon hit Kyoto in June 1212 and June 1217. Two typhoons affected Kyoto in 1226, one in June and one in August. Two typhoons rolled through Japan in August and November 1228, respectively, affecting both Kyoto and Kamakura, which again was responsible for an era name change (from Antei to Kangi). One typhoon struck Kyoto in July 1230, and at least one more swept across Japan in September of that year, one that ruined the rice harvests that were already crippled by abnormally cold weather, contributing to a severe nationwide famine. A typhoon struck Kyoto in July and November 1232. On May 16–17, 1233, Kyoto was hit by an atypically early strong typhoon, which caught the townsfolk off guard and caused extensive damage. A typhoon affected Kyoto in August 1238, August 1240, June and August 1242, August 1245, August 1247, and June 1251. A typhoon in September 1256 caused damage to rice paddies. A typhoon wrecked at least 61 vessels offshore the Izu Peninsula and more in Sagami Bay in October 1263, after which numerous bodies washed up on shore. A typhoon hit Kyoto in June 1271.

In 1281, according to Japanese legend, the Kamikaze (divine wind) typhoon destroyed the 2,200 ships of the Mongol emperor Kublai Khan, that were in Hakata Bay for attempting an invasion of Japan. Legends tell of 45,000 to 65,000 Mongol and Korean casualties from the typhoon. Damage estimates vary significantly, however, as another source places the death toll at over 100,000 and the number of wrecked vessels at close to 4,400.

A typhoon struck Kyoto in June 1284, July 1286, and July 1291. A typhoon hit Kyoto in August 1302. Two typhoon struck Kyoto in 1309, one in June and one in July. A typhoon affected Kyoto in August 1314, June 1320, June 1321, and November 1331. A typhoon in 1334 struck Kamakura and destroyed the building housing the Great Buddha at Kōtoku-in temple, after which it was rebuilt. A typhoon struck Kyoto in November 1339, June 1347, and July 1349. Two typhoons affected Kyoto in July and August 1350. A typhoon struck Kyoto in June 1352. A very early typhoon hit Kyoto in May 1353. Two typhoons struck Kyoto in August 1355 a few weeks apart. A typhoon struck Japan in September 1356 and caused flooding. A typhoon struck Kyoto in July 1359 and July 1366. The Great Buddha Hall at Kōtoku-in was again destroyed in a typhoon in 1369. While the building was rebuilt thereafter, it no longer exists after it was destroyed for the final time in an earthquake in 1498. The Buddha statue itself survives to this day with a few repairs.

Damaging typhoons rolled through Japan in 1445. In August 1450, the provinces of Suō and Nagato (the eastern and western halves of modern-day Yamaguchi Prefecture) was struck by an exceptionally powerful typhoon, which was said to be comparable to the 989 typhoon, damaging houses and castles. Another typhoon impacted Japan in 1459. A typhoon that struck Kyushu in August 1465 brought storm surges that caused coastal inundation in Hizen Province near the Ariake Sea, where people got around by boat for a distance of three li. (Note: At the time, the unit li (里) referred to two different lengths (about 600 m and about 4 km), and it is unclear as to which is being used in the source publication. As the shorter definition (Komichi (小道)) was commonly used in East Japan and the longer one (Ōmichi (大道)) in the west, it is likely that records on the disaster, which occurred in Kyushu, used the long li. If this is the case, the recorded distance is equivalent to roughly 12 kilometers.) The first typhoon recorded in Hokkaido occurred in September 1467, wrecking many ships offshore Matsumae Peninsula and causing floods over land. In September 1495, Ise Province, Japan, was struck by a typhoon and suffered severe flooding, which killed about 50. Several bridges within Ise Grand Shrine were washed away. Prolific haikai poet Arakida Moritake and his brother Moritoki were caught in the floods as their house was swept away with them inside, but both survived.

A probable typhoon affected Japan in September 1502, damaging crops with strong winds amid an ongoing famine (1501–1505). A typhoon in August 1517 caused major floods that laid waste on farmland across Japan, which brought about a severe famine the following year. Another crippling famine was worsened by a typhoon in September 1540 that carved its path through Japan from Kansai all the way to Aizu (now western Fukushima Prefecture). On 15 October 1555, the day before the Battle of Miyajima, a likely typhoon produced stormy conditions around Miyajima, which warlord Mōri Motonari capitalized on to conceal his approach towards Sue Harukata's forces, successfully defeating him in the following battle. A typhoon affected the Kinki region in September 1557 and, much like another typhoon in 817, produced deadly storm surges across the northern coast of Osaka Bay, killing 61 in Amagasaki alone.

==== Philippines ====
There were several storms between the Philippines and Guam in 1566. A typhoon struck the Philippines in August 1568. A typhoon affected Manila in June 1589. Three typhoons struck the Philippines between September and October 1596, one of which killed more than six people. There were also typhoons in October 1598 and 1599.

=== 1600s ===
==== China/Ming Dynasty (1368–1644), The Qing Dynasty (1636–1912) ====
In September 1618, a powerful typhoon struck the city of Chaozhou in eastern Guangdong, killing over 12,500 people and destroying more than 30,000 houses. A typhoon in July 1636 impacted Huiyang County (now Huiyang District, Huizhou), and tore off the roof of a pagoda. A typhoon in August 1673 produced strong winds and heavy rain in Guangdong, stripping houses of their roofs and snapping tall trees. In August 1680, a typhoon accompanied by a tidal flood inundated Shanghai in over 5 feet of water and killed countless people. In its wake, villagers sailed through their submerged fields and the bean crops that rotted there caused an outbreak of disease. Between late June and early July of 1696, a devastating typhoon produced storm surges that breached levees across Shanghai for thousands of feet, killing more than 100,000 people.

==== Japan ====
A typhoon struck Fukuoka in July 1610. A typhoon hit Hirado, Nagasaki in September 1613, where a European named Parachas recorded shifts in wind direction, the first such record taken in the country. A powerful typhoon, reportedly the worst in 100 years, affected much of Japan in September 1635 from Kyushu through Edo, blowing down 2,000 pine trees in Chikuzen Province. In September 1650, a typhoon produced storm surges in the Kyushu and Chugoku regions, flooding 3,300 houses and drowning 170 people in Yanagawa Domain alone.

==== Philippines and Guam ====
A typhoon struck the Philippines in May 1601, August 1602, July 1603, and August 1606. There were multiple typhoons in the Philippines in October and November 1608. A typhoon struck Marinduque in the Philippines on October 10, 1617, killing 1,000 people. Typhoons also affected the Philippines in August 1620 and May 1621. Two typhoons affected the Philippines in 1629 – in January and August. Another January typhoon occurred in 1630. Typhoons were observed in September and November 1638. Two typhoons struck the Philippines in 1639; one in August killed 750 people. A typhoon in October 1649 killed 200 people in the Philippines. A typhoon in May 1654 caused a shipwreck in the Philippines. There were three deadly typhoons in the Philippines in 1659. The first recorded storm to strike Guam was on October 6, 1671, which destroyed most of the houses on the island, and killed several people. Another typhoon struck Guam in November 1681, again destroying most of the island's houses. Typhoons affected the Philippines in July 1686 and September 1687. A typhoon struck Guam in November 1693, killing 14 people. In July 1694, a typhoon caused a shipwreck in the Philippines, killing more than 400 people. Another typhoon affected the Philippines in November 1697.

=== 1700s ===
A typhoon struck the Philippines in July 1704. In September 1707, a typhoon affected the Philippines. A typhoon existed in the South China Sea in August 1708. There were four typhoons in 1709. A storm struck the Philippines in October 1711. A strong typhoon existed in July 1717. In 1720, a typhoon affected Guam. A typhoon struck Shanghai in August 1723, which uprooted trees, damaged crops, and produced storm surges that drowned tens of thousands. In July 1726, a typhoon affected Ticao Island in the Philippines. A typhoon impacted Shanghai in September 1732 that caused severe storm surges and torrential rain, damaging buildings and killing large numbers of people and livestock. A typhoon struck Guam in December 1733, damaging crops and trees. There was a typhoon in December 1734. A typhoon struck Macau in September 1738. There were four typhoons in 1742. A typhoon in August 1747 killed more than 20,000 people in the counties of Shanghai and Nanhui alone. A typhoon made landfall in Taiwan in 1750 and wrecked several hundred merchant ships, one of the earliest Taiwan landfalls documented. In December 1752, a typhoon killed at least one person in the Philippines. There were two typhoons in 1753. There was a typhoon in December 1754 and in December 1757. A typhoon moved through the Philippines during the Battle of Manila in September 1762. Two typhoons struck the Philippines in 1766, including one in October that killed at least 48 people. A typhoon in October 1767 killed at least 500 people in San Mateo in the northern Philippines. There were two typhoons in 1768, resulting in at least one fatality. A typhoon affected southern China in May 1769. A typhoon sank a ship in May 1772.

Around 1775, a catastrophic typhoon, sometimes referred to as Typhoon Lengkieki, hit the atolls of Pingelap and Mokil in the Caroline Islands, and, combined with a following famine, induced a population bottleneck. Generations later, the Pingelapese, and the Mokilese to a lesser extent, have an unusually high incidence of achromatopsia, as a consequence of one of the survivors carrying the recessive alleles for the disease, which increased in frequency due to the founder effect and inbreeding among his descendants.

In September 1779, a typhoon moved through the northern Philippines. There were three typhoons in 1780, including a typhoon in July that killed around 100,000+ people near Macau and Hong Kong; this ranked among the deadliest tropical cyclones on record. There was a typhoon in the Philippines in August 1782. A typhoon struck Palau in August 1783. In 1792, a typhoon destroyed several buildings on Guam. Three typhoons struck the Philippines in 1793, including one that killed at least four people. A typhoon moved through the Philippines in 1795. Three typhoons struck the Philippines in 1797.

=== 1800–1849 ===
A typhoon struck the Philippines in October 1801 and September 1802. Two typhoons struck the Philippines in September 1803. A typhoon struck the Philippines in October 1804, September 1809, September 1810, October 1812, September 1819, September 1820, and October 1821. A typhoon struck Guam in December 1822. A typhoon struck the Philippines in October 1824. Two typhoons were recorded in 1824 and 1825, both at Okinawa in the Ryukyu Islands. In Vietnam from August 16, 1802, there was hardly any significant record of storm landfall until the end of October 1804.

In 1826, a typhoon in Okinawa caused 30 deaths and destroyed thousands of houses. Over 100 fishing boats were lost and 2,200 people died in the subsequent famine. There was also a typhoon in the Philippines in September of that year. There was a typhoon in October 1827 in the Philippines. In 1828, a typhoon hit Nagasaki causing an estimated 14,429 deaths on the shore of the Ariake Sea. This was the highest death toll from any typhoon in Japanese history. The German physician Philipp Franz von Siebold was present during this storm and succeeded in taking barometric pressure readings around Nagasaki at the risk of drowning. The storm was formally named after him.

There were three typhoons in 1829. There was a typhoon in the Philippines in 1830. There were three typhoons in 1831; one in July that caused flooding and storm surges in coastal Shanghai and killed over 9,500 people; one in September in the China Sea near Macau; and one in October that killed around 150 people in the Philippines. There were two typhoons in 1832, in 1833, and in 1835. Also in 1835, a typhoon was recorded at Yaeyama in the Ryukyu Islands. A typhoon struck Nagoya in September 1837, which damaged a kabuki theater within Wakamiya Hachiman Shrine and knocked down trees in the area. There was a typhoon in the Philippines in 1838. There were three typhoons in 1839.

Around 1840, a typhoon killed around 300 people in Likiep Atoll in the Marshall Islands.

There were four tropical cyclones in 1841, including three typhoons. There was one typhoon in 1842. There were one typhoon in the Philippines in 1843.

There were four tropical cyclones in 1844, including three typhoons. In November, a typhoon struck the Philippines and killed 32 people. A typhoon hit Miyako in the Ryukyu Islands. Over 2,000 houses were destroyed.

There were two tropical cyclones in 1845, including a typhoon that struck the Philippines and killed 12 people.

There were two tropical cyclones/tropical storm in 1846, including one typhoon.

There were three typhoons in 1848.

== See also ==
- Atlantic hurricane seasons
- Pacific hurricane seasons
- Tropical cyclone seasons
  - North Indian Ocean tropical cyclone season
  - South Pacific tropical cyclone season
