= 1937 Pacific typhoon season =

Seasonal boundaries
- First system formed: May 10, 1937
- Last system dissipated: December 14, 1937

Strongest storm
- Name: November Philippine typhoon
  - Lowest pressure: 951 hPa (mbar)

Seasonal statistics
- Total depressions: 25
- Typhoons: 18
- Total fatalities: 11525
- Total damage: $5.3 million (1937 USD)

Related articles
- 1937 Atlantic hurricane season; 1937 Pacific hurricane season; 1930s North Indian Ocean cyclone seasons

In 1937, there were 25 tropical cyclones across the northwestern Pacific Ocean, north of the equator and west of the International Date Line. There were at least 17 typhoons, which are tropical cyclones with sustained winds of at least 119 kilometres per hour (74 miles per hour). The year's strongest observed typhoon was in November, when a barometer in the eastern Philippines observed a barometric pressure of 951 mbar (28.1 inHg). The typhoon was the second in a series of three to make landfall in the eastern Philippines between November and December, resulting in a collective 289 fatalities, as well as causing an outbreak of dysentery. However, the deadliest storm of the season was a typhoon that struck Hong Kong in September, killing at least 11,000 people, mainly fishermen.

Tropical activity during the year began on May 10, when a tropical cyclone was observed in the South China Sea. In June, the season's first typhoon struck the Philippines, resulting in four fatalities, including three from a shipwreck. There were three tropical cyclones in July, the first of which hit China's Hainan island. The next typhoon moved through Japan, flooding thousands of houses. Another typhoon in July resulted in 28 deaths in the Philippines, before it weakened and struck eastern China near Shanghai. A series of eight tropical cyclones occurred in August, including one storm that dropped rainfall during the Battle of Shanghai amid the Second Sino-Japanese War, as well as a typhoon in the Korean peninsula that killed 130 people. Another typhoon moved across Japan in September, causing 70 fatalities. The final storm of the season dissipated on December 14 in the South China Sea.

== Systems ==
=== May–June ===
A tropical cyclone was observed west of the Philippines on May 10 in the South China Sea, moving to the northeast. Two days later, the system passed through the Batanes islands, between the Philippines and Taiwan. The storm was last observed on May 13.

On June 26, a depression formed within a trough to the east of the Marianas Islands. The system moved to the southwest before curving to the west, moving through the Marianas Islands on June 29. Continuing toward the Philippines, the depression intensified into a typhoon on July 2. Turning slightly west-northwestward, the typhoon brushed the northern coast of Luzon and moved through the Babuyan Islands. A station in Calayan recorded a minimum pressure of 958 mbar (28.3 inHg) shortly before the island experienced a two-hour calm during the passage of the eye. The typhoon killed one person in the Philippines, located in Baguio. The typhoon also sank a ship near Cabugao, killing three people. After affecting the Philippines, the typhoon weakened as it moved northwestward toward China. On July 4, the storm made landfall east of Hong Kong. Continuing inland, the system dissipated on July 6.

=== July ===
On July 17, a tropical cyclone formed in the South China Sea. Moving west-northwestward, it struck China's Hainan island on July 19 and dissipated shortly thereafter.

Another low pressure area originated near Guam on July 17, which developed into a depression by July 19 while located about 360 miles (580 km) east of Philippine's Samar island. The depression intensified into a typhoon by July 20 as it moved northwestward, remaining east of the Philippines. After curving to the northeast, the typhoon turned back to the north, moving through Japan's Ryukyu Islands on July 23. Stations in Japan recorded a minimum pressure of 985 mbar (29.1 inHg). On July 25, the typhoon struck Kyushu, where it flooded about 5,000 houses. The storm subsequently moved northeastward through the Sea of Japan; it was tracked until July 27.

Around July 26, the monsoon trough was producing a developing low pressure area to the east of the Philippines, which coalesced into a depression on July 29. After remaining nearly stationary for another two days, the system began a northward movement, after days of producing heavy rainfall in the Philippines. There were at least 28 deaths in the country related to the floods. On August 3, the typhoon moved northwestward through the southern Ryukyu Islands, with a pressure of 979 mbar (28.9 inHg) recorded at Ishigaki Island. Crossing the East China Sea, the typhoon moved ashore eastern China near Shanghai, degenerating into a "mild disturbance" by August 5, as described by the Monthly Weather Review (MWR). The typhoon killed at least one person in China, with another 125 people injured, after the typhoon wrecked buildings across Shanghai.

=== August ===
A low-pressure area persisted between Guam and Yap on August 1. Over the next few days, the system moved slowly northwestward, remaining east of the Philippines, eventually intensifying into a typhoon. On August 12, the typhoon passed about 145 km (90 mi) west of Okinawa in Japan's Ryukyu Islands, where a pressure of 995 mbar (29.4 inHg) was recorded. Continuing northwestward, the storm passed near Shanghai, and was no longer identifiable by August 15.

On August 5, newspapers reported that a typhoon killed 130 people near what is now Seoul, South Korea, with another 18 people injured.

A typhoon was observed on August 11 to the southwest of Guam. Moving northwestward, the typhoon had a small region of strong winds. On August 16, it moved through Japan's Ryukyu Islands, and the storm dissipated late on August 17 offshore eastern China. Rains from the typhoon occurred during the Battle of Shanghai amid the Second Sino-Japanese War.

A depression formed over the eastern Caroline Islands on August 16. Moving westward at first, it later curved to the northwest, bringing it south of Guam. By August 18, the system was of typhoon intensity, which continued northwesterly for the next three days. On August 21, the typhoon recurved to the north, and was already weakening. By the next day, the storm dissipated.

On August 16, another depression formed, which moved westward into the East China Sea. Continuing westward, it moved ashore China on August 17 and dissipated.

On August 19, a depression formed in the South China Sea. It crossed over China's Hainan island on August 21. Continuing across the Gulf of Tonkin, the depression turned northward into southern China, dissipating on August 22.

A depression was first observed on August 22 to the west-southwest of Yap. By August 23, the system attained typhoon intensity at it moved quickly to the west-northwest. A day later, the typhoon moved through the Visayas in the central Philippines, later emerging into the South China Sea. The storm had weakened by August 27, although the MWR described "renewed activity" after that date. After brushing Hainan island, the storm turned westward and struck what is now Vinh in central Vietnam, dissipating by August 30. A station there recorded a pressure of 998 mbar (29.5 inHg).

==== Hong Kong typhoon ====
- Typhoon (JMA)
- Category 3 typhoon (SSHWS)
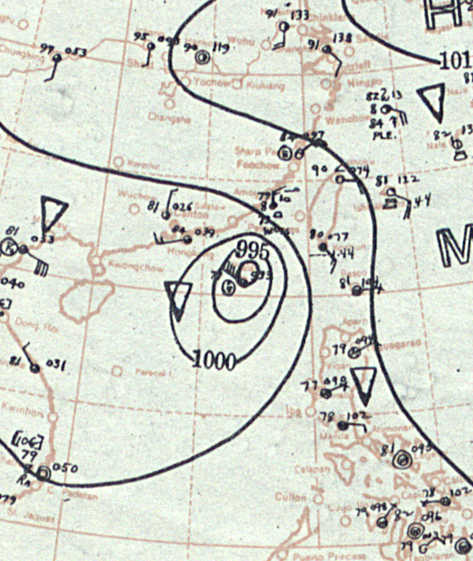
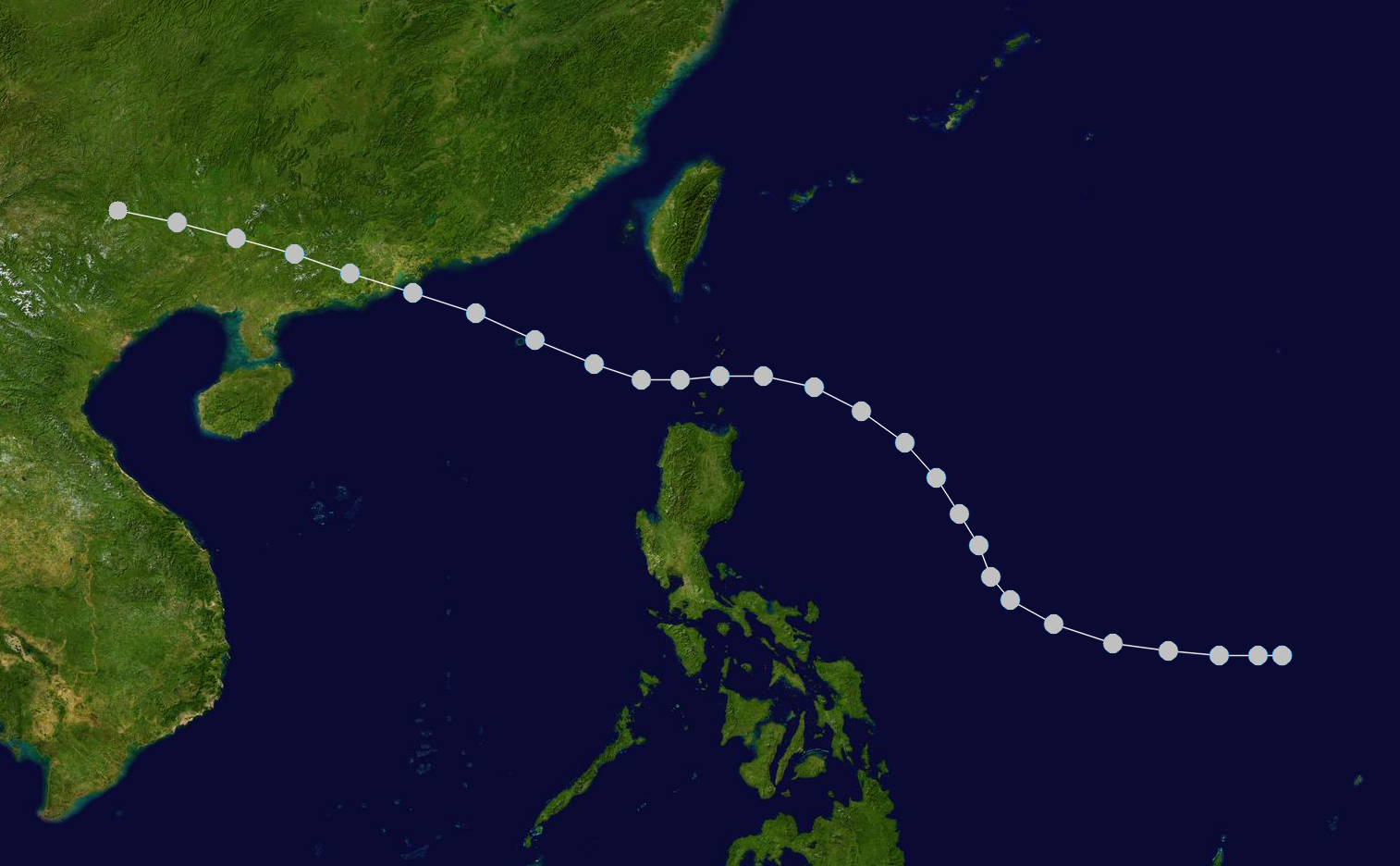
- Duration: August 24 – September 4
- Peak intensity: 185 km/h (115 mph) (1-min); 953 hPa (mbar)

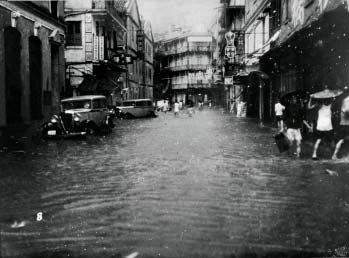
Floodwaters in Hong Kong from the typhoon that killed at least 11,000 people

A tropical cyclone originated south of Guam on August 24. For several days, there were little signs of development as the system moved generally to the west or northwest. On September 1, it moved through the Batanes islands in the far northern Philippines as a typhoon. A station in Basco recorded a pressure of 986 mbar (29.1 inHg). Thereafter, the typhoon moved toward southern China, passing just south of Hong Kong before making landfall on September 2 with estimated sustained winds of at least 201 km/h (125 mph). Wind gusts in Hong Kong reached at least 201 km/h (125 mph), although the true intensity was unknown, as the gusts surpassed the capacity of the anemometer. Unofficial nearby observations recorded gusts as high as 268 km/h (167 mph). At Victoria Harbour, the SS Shuntien observed a pressure of 953 mbar (28.1 inHg). The typhoon lashed the coast with high waves and tides. A high water mark at Tai Po was estimated at 6.2 metres (20.5 ft), with an entire village washed away. The typhoon was destructive and deadly, with at least 11,000 fatalities, most of them fishermen and sailors. The combination of high winds and floodwaters ruined entire villages, with houses wrecked, roads littered, and an estimated HK$1 million (US$300,000) worth of damages.

=== September ===
A tropical cyclone originated south of Yap on September 1, which proceeded slowly northwestward for several days. On September 5, the storm turned sharply eastward, remaining east of the Philippines and Taiwan. Thereafter, it intensified as it moved slowly. By September 8, the storm intensified into a typhoon as it curved to the north-northwest toward Japan. A day later the typhoon turned back to the northeast as it passed about 95 km (59 mi) east of the Okinawa, where a pressure of 980 mbar (29 inHg) was recorded. Late on September 10, the typhoon struck the Japanese island of Shikoku and proceeded across Honshu. Crossing the Sea of Japan, the storm moved across Shikoku and was last observed on September 13, proceeding eastward toward the Aleutian Islands. Across Japan, the typhoon killed at least 70 people. The storm swept away at least 25 boats and flooded thousands of houses. Train service was disrupted after the typhoon washed away track.

While the previous typhoon was active, a nearby secondary depression formed on September 7 off the northeast coast of Luzon, which lasted for two days before dissipating.

A depression formed southwest of Yap on September 15. It moved to the west-northwest toward the Philippines, moving across Luzon on September 18. After crossing the island, the storm entered the South China Sea, becoming a typhoon. It moved across China's Hainan Island on September 20 as it turned westward, making a final landfall in current-day Vietnam. Haiphong recorded winds of force 11 on the Beaufort scale, or winds of 103 km/h (64 mph). The storm dissipated on September 22.

A tropical cyclone was first observed on September 22 east of the Philippines. It tracked northeastward and was last observed on September 25.

Another tropical cyclone developed east of the Philippines on September 29. Moving northwestward, the system crossed the northeast coast of Luzon on October 2. The pressure in Calayan recorded a minimum pressure of 984 mbar (29.1 inHg), indicating it was of typhoon status. Subsequently, the typhoon moved across the South China Sea. Late on October 4, the storm moved ashore southern China, just east of Hong Kong. There, the storm delayed shipping. By October 6, the system dissipated.

=== October ===
A depression formed on October 8 over the open Pacific, north of the Caroline Islands, originating from a trough that extended from the Philippines to the Marianas Islands. Moving northwestward, it remained east of the Philippines, passing 195 km (121 mi) east of Luzon. The storm killed three people across Luzon. On October 16, the system turned northeastward, bringing it a short distance east of the Ryukyu Islands. Passing southeast of Japan, the storm mostly affected shipping routes. On October 17, the SS President Hoover recorded a pressure of 985 mbar (29.1 inHg). The storm was last observed a day later, moving toward the International Date Line.

The same trough that spawned the above system also generated another depression on October 10, located about 240 km (150 mi) east of Samar in the Philippines. The lowest pressure recorded in association with the system was about 1000 mbar (30 inHg), resulting in the MWR classifying the system as a typhoon. The cyclone moved westward until reaching the Lagonoy Gulf in southeastern Luzon. The typhoon failed to separate from the influence of the previous typhoon, and it dissipated by October 12.

A depression formed on October 15 to the south of Guam. It moved to the northwest without gaining much intensity. On October 23, it recurved to the northeast. After passing near Japan's Bonin Islands, the system was last observed on October 25.

On October 19, a typhoon was first observed in the South China Sea, east of what is now central Vietnam. That day, the S.S. Swartenhoudt recorded a pressure of 1003 mbar (29.6 inHg), as well as heavy rainfall, and typhoon-force winds. The system moved westward and moved ashore between Quy Nhon and Nha Trang. It dissipated by October 21.

=== November–December ===
A depression formed over the western Caroline Islands on November 8, which moved west-northwestward toward the Philippines. The storm was at typhoon intensity by the time it approached the Philippines, moving across Polillo Island before making landfall on November 12 along eastern Luzon near Infanta. A station there recorded a pressure of 961 mbar (28.4 inHg), along with an average hourly wind speed of 103 kilometres per hour (64 mph). The typhoon crossed Luzon, passing just north of the capital city of Manila. The typhoon killed 38 people across the archipelago, with many houses destroyed, leaving 40,000 people homeless. Several roads were washed, disrupting travel and communications. The damage was estimated at ₱2 million (US$1 million), of which about half was related to damaged crops. After weakening over land, the storm emerged into the South China Sea and failed to re-intensify to its former strength. On November 14, the storm struck what is now central Vietnam between Quy Nhon and Nha Trang. Following the storm, there was an outbreak of dysentery in Sorsogon province.

Another depression developed over the western Caroline Islands on November 15. Like the previous system, it intensified to typhoon status by the time it approached the Philippines. On November 18, it crossed the island of Leyte, passing just south of Ormoc on the west coast, which reported a minimum pressure of 959 mbar (28.3 inHg). The nearby island of Homonhon experienced the calm of the eyewall for about 15 minutes. On November 19, the SS Empress of Japan encountered the typhoon, recording a pressure of 951 mbar (28.1 inHg), the lowest recorded in association with the storm. The typhoon later crossed northern Cebu and northern Panay; in the latter island, Capiz reported a pressure of 967 mbar (28.6 inHg). After passing just south of Mindoro, the storm emerged into the South China Sea, as its motion turned to the northwest. On November 22, the storm recurved to the northeast and weakened, re-entering the Pacific Ocean on the next day. It was last observed on November 23 east of Taiwan. The MWR described the typhoon as "one of the worst typhoons to visit the Visayan Islands during recent years." Across the Philippines, the typhoon killed at least 247 people, with about 170,000 others left homeless. Damage was estimated at ₱8 million (US$4 million). The then-president of the Philippines, Manuel L. Quezon, declared a state of emergency for seven islands affected by the typhoon.

The final storm of the season originated from a low pressure area over the western Caroline Islands on November 30. Moving quickly west-northward toward the Philippines, it organized into a depression by December 2, while located east of Yap. The system intensified as its track shifted to the west-southwest, closely following the path of the previous typhoon. On December 5, the storm struck the eastern Philippines as a typhoon, crossing the southern portion of Samar. Borongan recorded a minimum pressure of 983 mbar (29.0 inHg). The typhoon weakened as it moved through the Visayas, emerging into the Sulu Sea as a weak low pressure area on December 8. While in the South China Sea, the system re-intensified. On December 12, the SS President Polk recorded a pressure of 1000 mbar (30 inHg). However, the strengthening was short-lived, and after progressing northward, the former typhoon dissipated on December 14.

== Season effects ==
D refers to a depression. TC refers to a tropical cyclone. TY refers to a typhoon, which is a tropical cyclone that produces sustained winds of at least 119 km/h (74 mph).

Name	Dates	Peak intensity			Areas affected	Damage (USD)	Deaths	Ref(s).
Name	Dates	Category	Wind speed	Pressure	Areas affected	Damage (USD)	Deaths	Ref(s).
TC	May 10 – 13	Not specified	Not specified	Not specified	Philippines	None	None	
TY	June 26 – July 6	Typhoon	⩾120 km/h (75 mph)	958 mbar (28.3 inHg)	Philippines, China	None	4	
TC	July 17 – 19	Not specified	Not specified	Not specified	China	None	None	
TY	July 19 – 27	Typhoon	⩾120 km/h (75 mph)	985 mbar (29.1 inHg)	Japan	None	None	
TY	July 29 – August 5	Typhoon	⩾120 km/h (75 mph)	979 mbar (28.9 inHg)	Philippines, Japan, China	None	29	
TY	August 1 – 15	Typhoon	⩾120 km/h (75 mph)	995 mbar (29.4 inHg)	Japan, China	None	None	
TY	August 5	Typhoon	⩾120 km/h (75 mph)	Not specified	Korean peninsula	None	130	
TY	August 11 – 17	Typhoon	⩾120 km/h (75 mph)	Not specified	Japan, China	None	None	
TY	August 16 – 22	Typhoon	⩾120 km/h (75 mph)	Not specified	None	None	None	
TD	August 16 – 17	Tropical Depression	Not specified	Not specified	China	None	None	
TD	August 19 – 21	Tropical Depression	Not specified	Not specified	China	None	None	
TY	August 22 – 30	Typhoon	⩾120 km/h (75 mph)	998 mbar (29.5 inHg)	None	None	None	
Hong Kong typhoon	August 24 – September 3	Typhoon	⩾180 km/h (110 mph)	953 mbar (28.1 inHg)	Philippines, China (especially Hong Kong)	$300,000	>11,000	
TY	September 1 – 13	Typhoon	⩾120 km/h (75 mph)	980 mbar (29 inHg)	Japan	None	70	
TD	September 7 – 9	Tropical Depression	Not specified	Not specified	None	None	None	
TY	September 15 – 22	Typhoon	⩾120 km/h (75 mph)	Not specified	Philippines, China, Vietnam	None	None	
TC	September 22 – 25	Not specified	Not specified	Not specified	Philippines	None	None	
TY	September 29 – October 6	Typhoon	⩾120 km/h (75 mph)	984 mbar (29.1 inHg)	Philippines, China	None	None	
TY	October 8 – 21	Typhoon	⩾120 km/h (75 mph)	985 mbar (29.1 inHg)	Japan	None	3	
TY	October 10 – 12	Typhoon	⩾120 km/h (75 mph)	1,000 mbar (30 inHg)	None	None	None	
TC	October 15 – 25	Not specified	Not specified	Not specified	None	None	None	
TY	October 19 – 21	Typhoon	⩾120 km/h (75 mph)	<1003 mbar (29.6 inHg)	Vietnam	None	None	
TY	November 8 – 14	Typhoon	⩾120 km/h (75 mph)	951 mbar (28.1 inHg)	Philippines, Vietnam	$1 million	38	
TY	November 15 – 23	Typhoon	⩾120 km/h (75 mph)	959 mbar (28.3 inHg)	Philippines	$4 million	247	
TY	December 2 – 14	Typhoon	⩾120 km/h (75 mph)	983 mbar (29.0 inHg)	Philippines	None	4	
Season aggregates
22 systems	May 10 – December 15, 1937		180 km/h (110 mph)	951 mbar (28.08 inHg)		$5.3 million	11,236	

== See also ==
- 1937 Pacific hurricane season
- 1937 Atlantic hurricane season
- 1930s North Indian Ocean cyclone seasons
- 1900–1950 South-West Indian Ocean cyclone seasons
- 1900–1940 South Pacific cyclone seasons
- 1930s Australian region cyclone seasons
