= 1937 Pacific hurricane season =

Seasonal boundaries
- First system formed: May 25, 1937
- Last system dissipated: October 24, 1937

Strongest storm
- Name: Four
  - Lowest pressure: 986 mbar (hPa; 29.12 inHg)

Seasonal statistics
- Total storms: 5
- Hurricanes: 1
- Total fatalities: Unknown
- Total damage: Unknown

Related articles
- 1937 Atlantic hurricane season; 1937 Pacific typhoon season; 1930s North Indian Ocean cyclone seasons

The 1937 Pacific hurricane season ran through the summer and fall of 1937. Before the satellite age started in the 1960s, data on east Pacific hurricanes was extremely unreliable. Most east Pacific storms were of no threat to land. 1937 season was mostly inactive season, as there is no known tropical cyclones in September during this season. In May, a tropical cyclone struck Acapulco, cutting that city off from the outside communication for four days, causing buildings in the city to be damaged, and caused a woman's death.

== Systems ==
=== Tropical Cyclone One ===
On May 25, a tropical cyclone was detected south of Acapulco. The cyclone headed northwards, made landfall directly at Acapulco that day. Weather associated with this tropical cyclone made it to Gulf of Mexico, where they became a depression in the Bay of Campeche on May 27. However, this depression never developed into anything.

This tropical cyclone destroyed telephone and telegraph lines leading into Acapulco, cutting that city off from the outside world for four days. Numerous buildings in the city were damaged. Several fishing boats were missing, and a woman was killed when a telephone pole was blown down on her.

=== Possible Tropical Cyclone Two ===
On June 16, while west of the Revillagigedo Islands, a ship encountered a possible westward-moving tropical cyclone. The ship reported a pressure of 29.74 inHg (100.7 kPa).

=== Tropical Cyclone Three ===
On June 23, a tropical cyclone was spotted developing south of Acapulco. It had fully formed by June 24, and moved northward. It then turned to the north-northeast and approached the Gulf of California, where it subsequently dissipated on June 26. The lowest pressure reported by a ship was 29.63 inHg (100.3 kPa).

=== Hurricane Four ===
On August 31, a hurricane was observed west of the Revillagigedo Islands. A ship measured a central pressure of 29.12 inHg (98.6 kPa).

=== Tropical Cyclone Five ===
On October 24, a tropical cyclone formed well south of the Revillagigedo Islands. It rapidly headed northeast, and had approached land somewhere between Manzanillo and Cape Corrientes by October 27. At that point, the cyclone fell apart and ceased to exist. A ship reported a pressure of 29.59 inHg (100.2 kPa).

== See also ==
- 1937 Atlantic hurricane season
- 1937 Pacific typhoon season
- 1930s North Indian Ocean cyclone seasons
- 1900–1940 South Pacific cyclone seasons
- 1900–1950 South-West Indian Ocean cyclone seasons
- 1930s Australian region cyclone seasons
