= Timeline of the 2020 Pacific typhoon season =

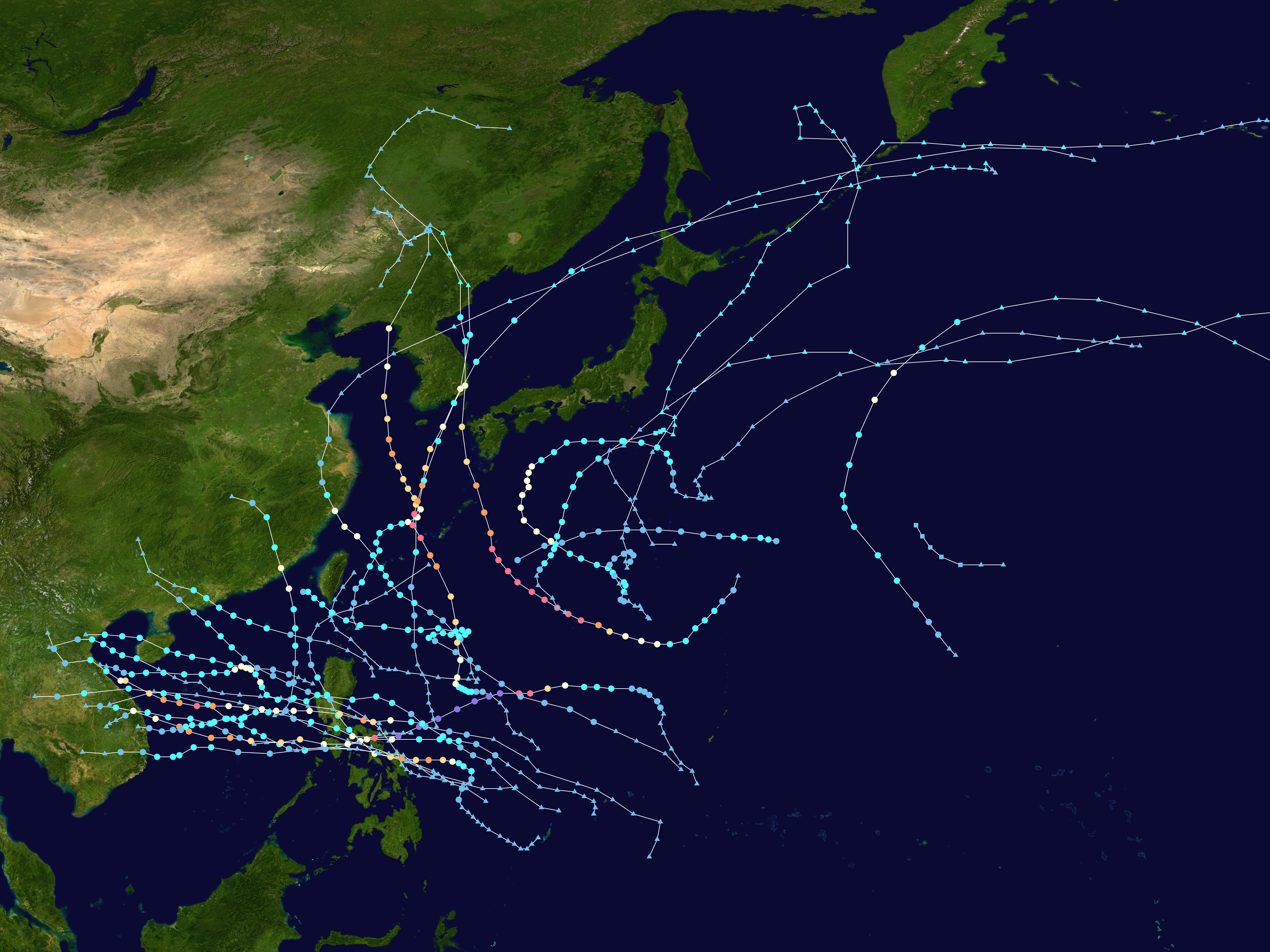
- Season summary map

Season boundaries
- First system formed: May 8, 2020
- Last system dissipated: December 29, 2020

Strongest system
- Name: Goni
- Maximum winds: 220 km/h (140 mph) (10-minute sustained)
- Lowest pressure: 905 hPa (mbar)

Longest lasting system
- Name: Chan-hom
- Duration: 13 days
Storm articles
- Typhoon Vongfong (2020)
- Typhoon Hagupit (2020)
- Tropical Storm Sinlaku (2020)
- Tropical Storm Mekkhala (2020)
- Tropical Storm Higos (2020)
- Typhoon Bavi (2020)
- Typhoon Maysak (2020)
- Typhoon Haishen (2020)
- Tropical Storm Noul (2020)
- Tropical Storm Linfa
- Tropical Storm Nangka (2020)
- Typhoon Saudel
- Typhoon Molave
- Typhoon Goni
- Typhoon Vamco
- Tropical Storm Krovanh (2020)

The 2020 Pacific typhoon season was the first in a series of below-average Pacific typhoon seasons which persisted until 2023. It was also the first below-average tropical cyclone season since 2014, a consequence of La Niña that persisted from the summer of the year. The first half of the season was unusually inactive, with only four systems, two named storms, and one typhoon at the end of July. Additionally, the JTWC recorded no tropical cyclone development in the month of July, the first such occurrence since reliable records began. Despite that, this season featured Typhoon Goni, which made the strongest landfall worldwide in terms of 1-minute wind speed. The season also had the seventh-latest start in the basin on record, slightly behind 1973, with the season's first tropical system not forming until May. The season's first named tropical cyclone, Vongfong, developed on May 8, while the season's last named tropical cyclone, Krovanh, dissipated on December 24. However, the season's last system was an unnamed tropical depression, which dissipated on December 29.

This timeline documents all of the events of the 2020 Pacific typhoon season. The season ran throughout the year, though most tropical cyclones formed between May and November. The scope of this article is limited to the Pacific Ocean, north of the equator between 100°E and the International Date Line (IDL). Tropical storms that form in the entire Western Pacific basin are assigned a name by the Japan Meteorological Agency (JMA). Tropical depressions that form in this basin are given a number with a "W" suffix by the United States' Joint Typhoon Warning Center (JTWC). In addition, the Philippine Atmospheric, Geophysical and Astronomical Services Administration (PAGASA) assigns names to tropical cyclones (including tropical depressions) that enter or form in the Philippine Area of Responsibility (PAR). These names, however, are not in common use outside of the Philippines.

During the season, 32 systems were designated as tropical depressions by either the JMA, PAGASA, JTWC, or other National Meteorological and Hydrological Services such as the China Meteorological Administration (CMA) and the Hong Kong Observatory (HKO). 23 of these tropical depressions became named storms, and 10 of these named storms intensified to typhoons. Furthermore, 2 of those strengthened further to super-typhoons. (Note: Super typhoons are an unofficial classification given by the Joint Typhoon Warning Center for storms whose strength are 130 knots (240 km/h; 150 mph) or above.)

== Timeline ==
=== January ===
January 1

- 00:00 UTC – The 2020 Pacific typhoon season officially begins, though no tropical cyclones have formed until May.

=== May ===
May 8

- 06:00 UTC at 6.8°N 134.0°E – The JMA starts tracking a tropical depression near Palau with a central pressure of 1,006 hPa (1,006 mbar; 29.71 inHg).
- 18:00 UTC at 6.3°N 132.9°E – The JMA assesses the tropical depression near Palau has re-attained a central pressure of 1,006 hPa (1,006 mbar; 29.71 inHg).

May 9

- 06:00 UTC at 6.7°N 132.5°E – The tropical depression west of Palau re-attains a central pressure of 1,006 hPa (1,006 mbar; 29.71 inHg) as it slowly moves northwestward.
- 18:00 UTC (02:00 PHT, May 10) at 7.2°N 132.0°E – The PAGASA starts to track the tropical depression west of Palau, naming it Ambo.

May 10

- 06:00 UTC at 7.9°N 130.9°E – Tropical Depression Ambo attains a lower central pressure of 1,004 hPa (1,004 mbar; 29.65 inHg), per the JMA.
- 18:00 UTC at 8.3°N 129.7°E – The JMA analyzes Ambo's central pressure has dipped back to a central pressure of 1,004 hPa (1,004 mbar; 29.65 inHg) as it slowly moves while remaining east of Mindanao.

May 11

- 06:00 UTC at 8.7°N 129.0°E – Ambo's central pressure continues to fluctuate as it re-deepens back to 1,004 hPa (1,004 mbar; 29.65 inHg) while moving generally northward, per the JMA.
- 18:00 UTC
  - At 9.6°N 129.2°E – Ambo re-attains a central pressure of 1,004 hPa (1,004 mbar; 29.65 inHg) as it shifts to the north-northeastward.
  - At 9.6°N 128.9°E – The JTWC starts tracking on Ambo, designating it as 01W.

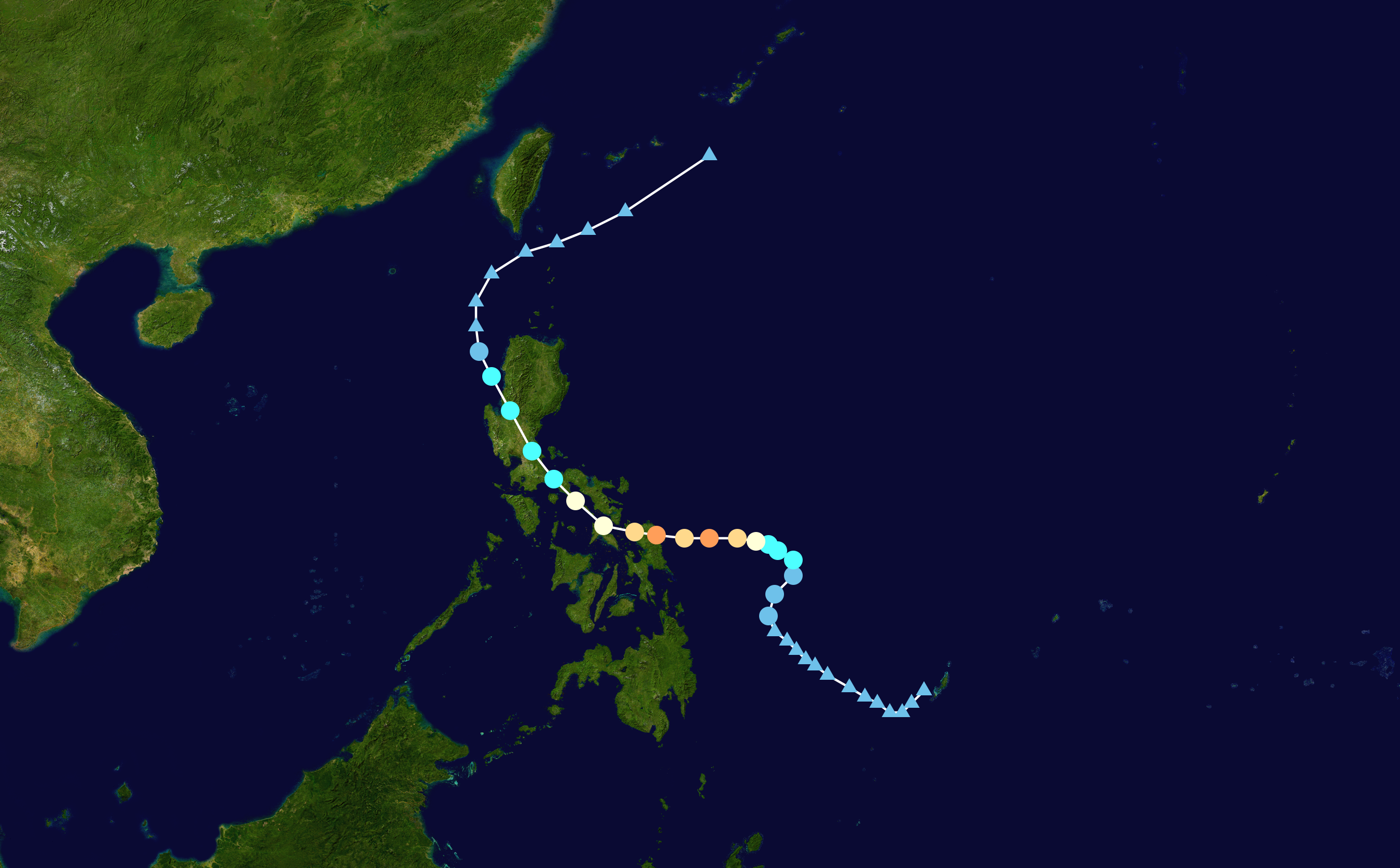
Track of Vongfong during early-mid May.

May 12

- 06:00 UTC at 10.9°N 129.7°E – The JTWC assesses 01W (Ambo) has deepened to a central pressure of 1,002 hPa (1,002 mbar; 29.59 inHg) as it gradually turns to the northwest.
- 12:00 UTC
  - (20:00 PHT) at 11.3°N 129.5°E – The JMA and PAGASA report 01W (Ambo) has intensified to a tropical storm, with the former naming it Vongfong.
  - At 11.4°N 129.7°E – The JTWC also upgrades Vongfong (Ambo) to a tropical storm.

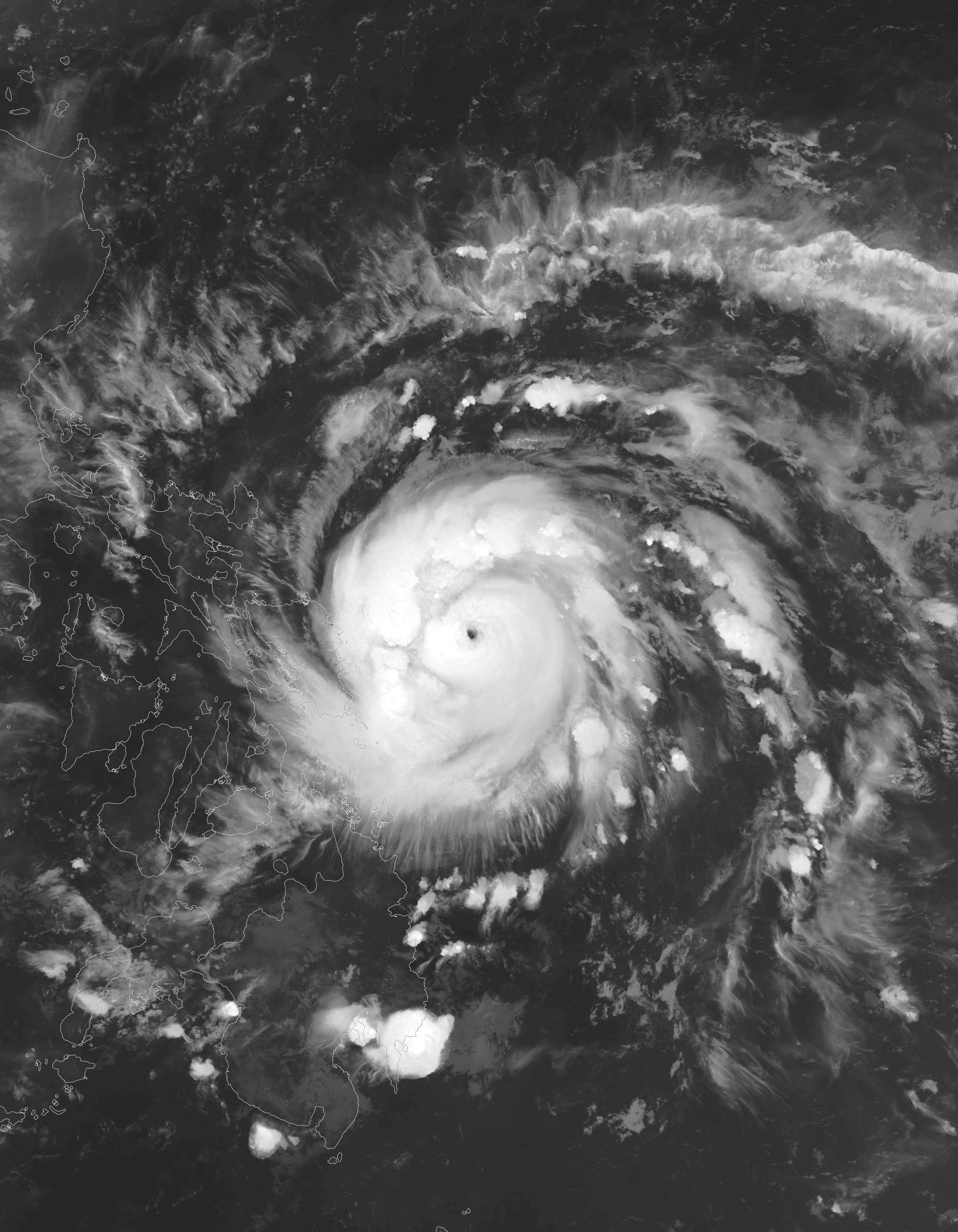
Vongfong near its peak intensity approaching the Philippines on May 13.

May 13

- 00:00 UTC
  - At 11.8°N 128.9°E – The JMA further upgrades Vongfong (Ambo) to a severe tropical storm as it turns westward.
  - (08:00 PHT) at 11.9°N 128.9°E – The PAGASA follows suit, upgrading Vongfong (Ambo) to a severe tropical storm.
- 06:00 UTC at 12.0°N 128.5°E – The JTWC assesses Vongfong (Ambo) has strengthened to a Category 1 typhoon.
- 12:00 UTC
  - At 12.2°N 127.8°E – The JMA reports Vongfong (Ambo) has intensified to a typhoon.
  - At 12.1°N 127.9°E – The JTWC upgrades Vongfong (Ambo) further to a Category 2 typhoon.
  - (20:00 PHT) at 12.1°N 127.9°E – The PAGASA also upgrades Vongfong (Ambo) to a typhoon as it approaches Samar.
- 18:00 UTC at 12.1°N 127.0°E – The JTWC reports Vongfong (Ambo) has further intensified to a Category 3 typhoon, peaking with 1-minute sustained winds of 100 knots (190 km/h; 120 mph) and a central pressure of 961 hPa (961.0 mbar; 28.38 inHg).
- 21:00 UTC (05:00 PHT, May 14) at 12.2°N 126.5°E – The PAGASA also assesses Typhoon Vongfong (Ambo) has peaked with 10-minute sustained winds of 85 knots (157 km/h; 98 mph) and a central pressure of 960 hPa (960.0 mbar; 28.35 inHg).

Vongfong making landfall on Samar on May 14.

May 14

- 00:00 UTC at 12.1°N 126.2°E – The JMA reports Vongfong (Ambo) has peaked with 10-minute sustained winds of 85 knots (157 km/h; 98 mph) and a central pressure of 960 hPa (960.0 mbar; 28.35 inHg). However, the JTWC determines that the system has begun to weaken and is now a Category 2 typhoon as it is about to make landfall on Samar.
- 04:15 UTC (12:15 PHT) at 12.2°N 125.5°E – Typhoon Vongfong (Ambo) makes its first landfall on San Policarpo, Eastern Samar.
- 06:00 UTC at 12.2°N 125.3°E – The JTWC reports Vongfong (Ambo) has re-intensified to a Category 3 typhoon, re-attaining 1-minute sustained winds of 100 knots (190 km/h; 120 mph) but with a slightly higher central pressure of 962 hPa (962.0 mbar; 28.41 inHg) while traversing the island.
- 12:00 UTC at 12.3°N 124.6°E – The JTWC downgrades Vongfong (Ambo) back to a Category 2 typhoon.
- 14:15 UTC (22:15 PHT) at 12.4°N 124.3°E – After emerging over Dalupiri Pass, Typhoon Vongfong (Ambo) makes its second hit on San Antonio (Dalupiri Island), Northern Samar.
- 14:30 UTC (22:30 PHT) at 12.4°N 124.2°E – Briefly crossing Capul Pass, Vongfong (Ambo) makes its third landfall on Capul (Capul Island), Northern Samar.
- 16:00 UTC (00:00 PHT, May 15) at 12.6°N 123.7°E – After emerging over the northern portion of Samar Sea and traversing Ticao Pass, Vongfong (Ambo) makes its fourth strike on San Jacinto (Ticao Island), Masbate.
- 18:00 UTC at 12.5°N 123.6°E – After emerging over Masbate Pass, the JTWC downgrades Vongfong (Ambo) further to a Category 1 typhoon.
- 19:00 UTC (03:00 PHT, May 15) at 12.9°N 123.2°E – Typhoon Vongfong (Ambo) makes its fifth hit on Claveria (Burias Island), Masbate, after briefly traversing the eastern reaches of Sibuyan Sea.

May 15

- 00:00 UTC (08:00 PHT) at 13.3°N 122.7°E – Typhoon Vongfong (Ambo) makes its sixth and final landfall on San Andres, Quezon.
- 03:00 UTC (11:00 PHT) at 13.7°N 122.2°E – The PAGASA downgrades Vongfong (Ambo) to a severe tropical storm as it traverses the Bondoc Peninsula.
- 06:00 UTC
  - At 14.0°N 121.9°E – The JMA also downgrades Vongfong (Ambo) to a severe tropical storm as it moves northwestward.
  - At 14.0°N 122.0°E – The JTWC reports Vongfong (Ambo) has weakened further to a tropical storm.
- 12:00 UTC
  - At 14.9°N 121.3°E – The JMA downgrades Vongfong (Ambo) further to a tropical storm while moving northwestward over Luzon.
  - (20:00 PHT) at 15.0°N 121.2°E – The PAGASA follows suit, downgrading Vongfong (Ambo) to a tropical storm.
- 21:00 UTC (05:00 PHT, May 16) at 16.5°N 120.3°E – The PAGASA reports Vongfong (Ambo) has weakened further to a tropical depression as it emerges over the Lingayen Gulf.

May 16

- 00:00 UTC at 18.0°N 120.0°E – The JTWC reports Vongfong (Ambo) has briefly deepened to a central pressure of 998 hPa (998.0 mbar; 29.47 inHg).
- 06:00 UTC
  - At 18.7°N 120.0°E – The JTWC downgrades Vongfong (Ambo) to a tropical depression as it moves over the South China Sea.
  - (14:00 PHT) at 18.0°N 119.4°E – The PAGASA assesses Vongfong (Ambo) has deepened to a central pressure of 1,002 hPa (1,002 mbar; 29.59 inHg).
- 12:00 UTC
  - At 18.9°N 119.5°E – The JMA reports Vongfong (Ambo) has deteriorated further to a tropical depression.
  - At 19.2°N 120.3°E – The JTWC downgrades Vongfong (Ambo) further to a tropical disturbance as it gradually recurves to the northeast.

May 17

- 06:00 UTC (14:00 PHT) at 21.3°N 121.1°E – The PAGASA analyzes Vongfong (Ambo) has re-attained a central pressure of 1,002 hPa (1,002 mbar; 29.59 inHg) as it enters the Bashi Channel.
- 18:00 UTC (02:00 PHT, May 18) at 22.0°N 123.1°E – The JMA and PAGASA report Vongfong (Ambo) has deepened to a central pressure of 1,002 hPa (1,002 mbar; 29.59 inHg) as it gradually accelerates to the northeast.

May 18

- 00:00 UTC (08:00 PHT) at 22.6°N 124.3°E – The PAGASA reports Vongfong (Ambo) has weakened to a remnant low south of the Yaeyama Islands.
- 06:00 UTC at 24.4°N 127.0°E – The JMA last notes Vongfong as it re-attains a central pressure of 1,002 hPa (1,002 mbar; 29.59 inHg); the system dissipated six hours later near Okinawa Island.

=== June ===
June 10

- 00:00 UTC at 11.3°N 126.4°E – The JMA starts tracking a newly-formed tropical depression near Samar.

Water vapor loop of Butchoy (pre-Nuri) making landfall on Luzon on June 11.

June 11

- 00:00 UTC (08:00 PHT) at 14.2°N 123.7°E – After tracking generally northwestward, PAGASA names the tropical depression formerly near Samar, Butchoy, as it moves near Bicol Region.
- 04:00 UTC (12:00 PHT) at 14.5°N 122.9°E – Tropical Depression Butchoy hits the Calaguas Islands.
- 06:00 UTC (14:00 PHT) at 14.7°N 122.6°E – The PAGASA reports Butchoy has deepened to a central pressure of 1,002 hPa (1,002 mbar; 29.59 inHg) as it makes its closest approach to the Polilo Islands.
- 14:00 UTC (22:00 PHT) at 15.7°N 121.5°E – Tropical Depression Butchoy makes another landfall at San Luis, Aurora.
- 18:00 UTC at 15.9°N 120.8°E – The JTWC starts tracking Butchoy, designating it as 02W, as it traverses Luzon.

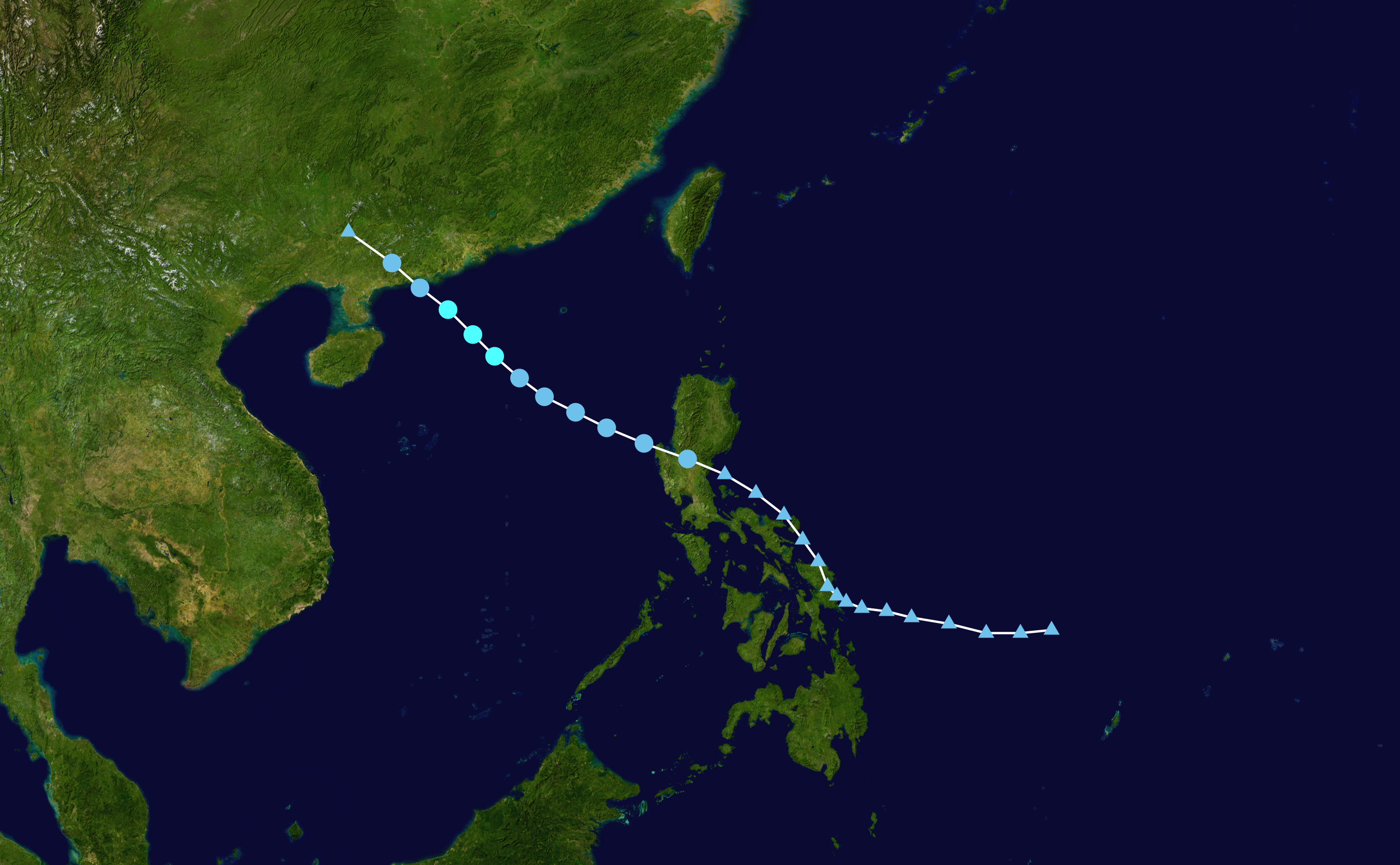
Track of Nuri during mid June.

June 12

- 00:00 UTC at 16.4°N 119.4°E – After emerging over the South China Sea, the JTWC determines 02W (Butchoy) has deepened to a central pressure of 1,000 hPa (1,000 mbar; 29.53 inHg).
- 12:00 UTC (20:00 PHT) at 16.8°N 117.6°E – The JMA and PAGASA upgrade 02W (Butchoy) to a tropical storm, with the former naming it Nuri and the latter assessing it has attained 10-minute winds of 35 knots (65 km/h; 40 mph) and a central pressure of 998 hPa (998.0 mbar; 29.47 inHg).
- 17:00 UTC (01:00 PHT, June 13) – The PAGASA reports Nuri (Butchoy) has left the PAR.
- 18:00 UTC at 17.9°N 116.2°E – The JTWC assesses Nuri has deepened further to a central pressure of 999 hPa (999.0 mbar; 29.50 inHg) as it approaches southern China.

June 13

- 00:00 UTC at 18.4°N 115.6°E – The JMA assesses Nuri has peaked with 10-minute winds of 40 knots (74 km/h; 46 mph) and a central pressure of 996 hPa (996.0 mbar; 29.41 inHg).
- 06:00 UTC at 19.2°N 114.6°E – The JTWC upgrades Nuri to a tropical storm, simultaneously attaining its maximum 1-minute winds of 35 knots (65 km/h; 40 mph).
- 12:00 UTC at 19.9°N 113.9°E – The JTWC analyzes that Nuri has attained its minimum central pressure of 995 hPa (995.0 mbar; 29.38 inHg) as it continues to move northwestward.

June 14

- 00:00 UTC
  - At 21.6°N 112.1°E – The JMA reports Nuri has weakened to a tropical depression as it is about to make landfall in China.
  - At 21.4°N 112.2°E – The JTWC also downgrades Nuri to a tropical depression.
- 00:50 UTC (08:50 CST) at 21.6°N 111.9°E – Tropical Depression Nuri makes its last landfall at Hailing Island, Yangjiang City, Guangdong.
- 06:00 UTC at 22.6°N 111.0°E – The JMA stops tracking Nuri as it moves further inland, with the system subsequently dissipating six hours later.
- 12:00 UTC at 23.2°N 109.9°E – The JTWC downgrades Nuri further to a tropical disturbance.

=== July ===
July 11

- 06:00 UTC at 17.2°N 130.1°E – The JMA marks a tropical depression over the Philippine Sea with a central pressure of 1,004 hPa (1,004 mbar; 29.65 inHg).

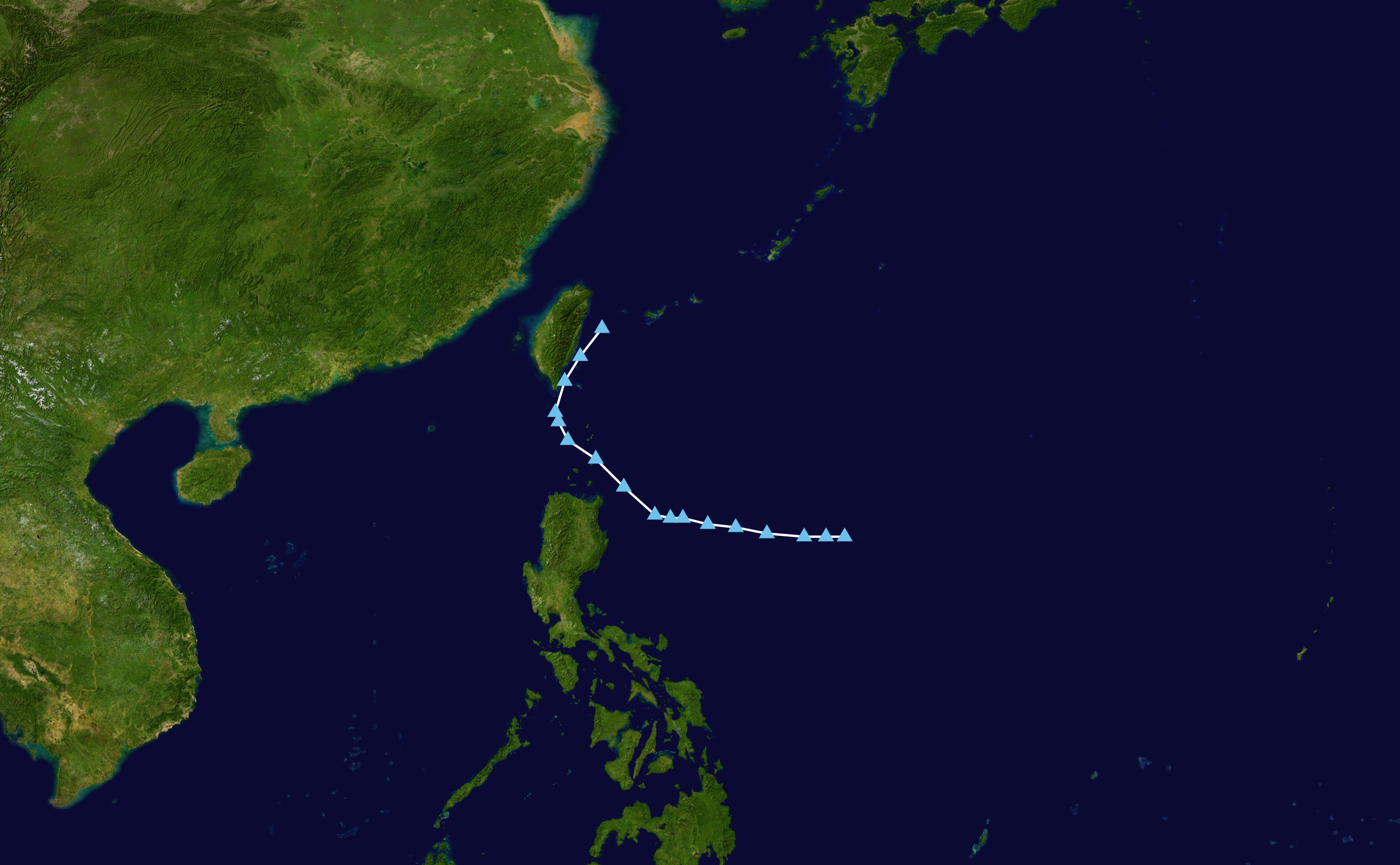
Track of Carina during mid July.

July 12

- 06:00 UTC
  - At 17.5°N 126.6°E – The JMA assesses the tropical depression over the Philippine Sea re-attains a central pressure of 1,004 hPa (1,004 mbar; 29.65 inHg).
  - (14:00 PHT) at 17.5°N 126.8°E – The PAGASA starts tracking on the tropical depression over the Philippine Sea, designating it Carina, as it attains 10-minute sustained winds of 25 knots (46 km/h; 29 mph) and a central pressure of 1,004 hPa (1,004 mbar; 29.65 inHg).

July 14

- 06:00 UTC at 20.9°N 120.9°E – After going through the Balintang Channel and turning northward, the JMA assesses Carina has re-attained a central pressure of 1,004 hPa (1,004 mbar; 29.65 inHg) as it now crosses the Bashi Channel.
- 12:00 UTC (20:00 PHT) at 21.2°N 120.7°E – The PAGASA reports Carina has degenerated to a remnant low as it approaches Taiwan.
- 18:00 UTC at 22.2°N 121.1°E – The JMA assesses Ex-Carina has deepened back to a central pressure of 1,004 hPa (1,004 mbar; 29.65 inHg) as it grazes the southeastern coast of Taiwan.

July 15

- 00:00 UTC at 23.0°N 121.6°E – The JMA last notes Ex-Carina off the eastern coast of Taiwan, with the system becoming indistinguishable six hours later.

July 27

- 18:00 UTC at 24.4°N 163.2°E – The JMA marks a tropical depression east of Minamitorishima with a central pressure of 1,010 hPa (1,010 mbar; 29.83 inHg).

July 28

- 06:00 UTC at 24.4°N 160.5°E – The JTWC determines the tropical depression east of Minamitorishima, tagged 90W, as a subtropical depression as it turns to the northwest.

July 29

- 00:00 UTC at 26.2°N 158.1°E – The JMA reports 90W has weakened to a low-pressure area northeast of Minamitorishima.
- 06:00 UTC at 26.9°N 157.7°E – The JTWC assesses 90W has peaked with 1-minute winds of 30 knots (56 km/h; 35 mph) and a central pressure of 1,006 hPa (1,006 mbar; 29.71 inHg) as it gradually recurves to the northeast.

July 30

- 00:00 UTC at 29.9°N 158.4°E – The JTWC last notes Subtropical Depression 90W as it dissipates well northeast of Minamitorishima.
- 18:00 UTC at 15.2°N 131.2°E – A tropical depression forms over the Philippine Sea, with a central pressure of 1,006 hPa (1,006 mbar; 29.71 inHg).

July 31

- 00:00 UTC
  - At 16.6°N 114.0°E – Another tropical depression forms over the South China Sea.
  - (08:00 PHT) at 16.7°N 131.0°E – The PAGASA starts tracking on the tropical depression over the Philippine Sea, designating it Dindo, as it moves northwestward.
- 06:00 UTC at 17.2°N 130.2°E – The JMA assesses Dindo has re-attained a central pressure of 1,006 hPa (1,006 mbar; 29.71 inHg).
- 18:00 UTC at 18.4°N 129.6°E – The JTWC designates Dindo as 03W as it continues to move northwestward.

=== August ===
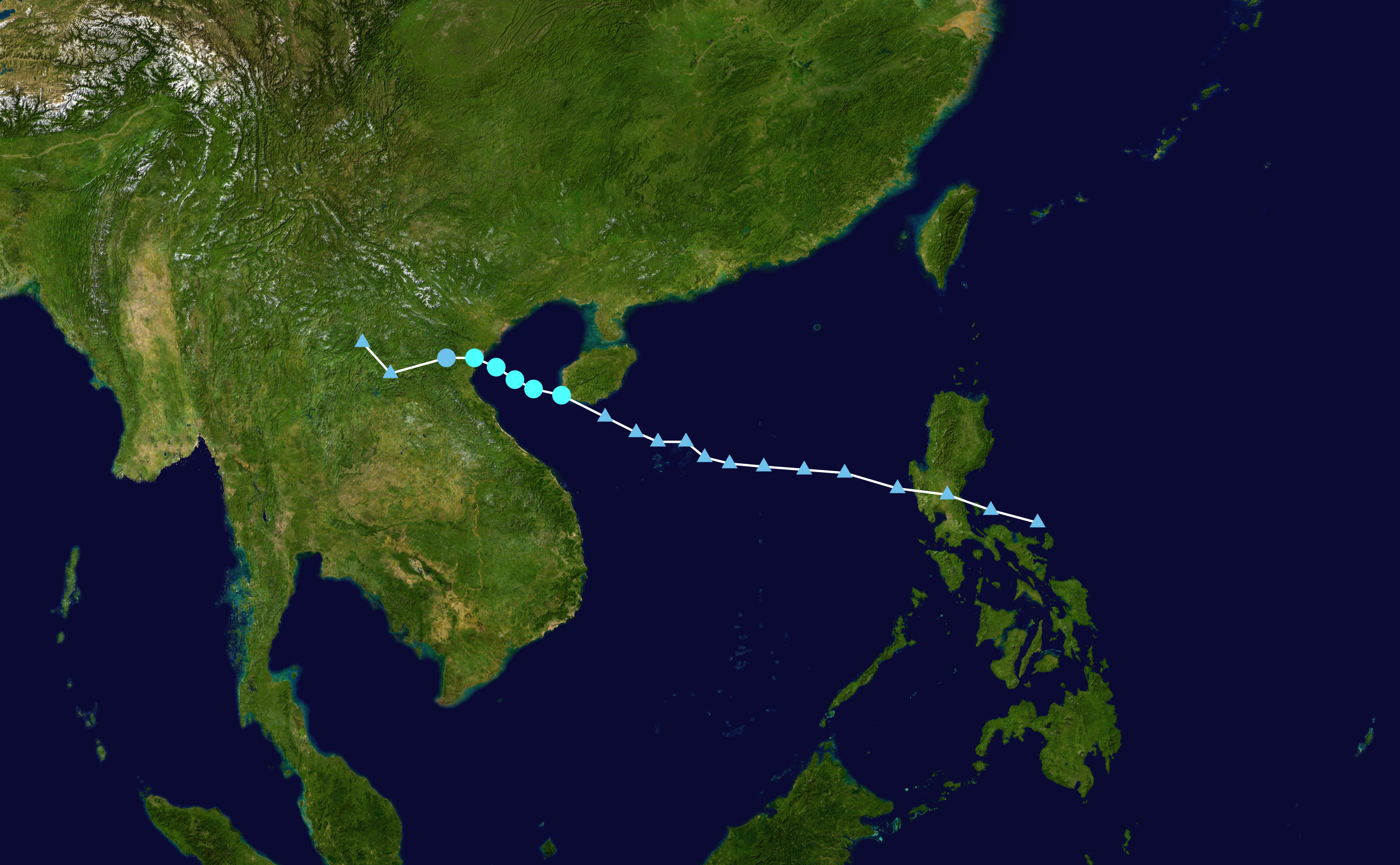
Track of Sinlaku during late July to early August.

August 1

- 00:00 UTC
  - At 17.8°N 110.7°E – The JMA upgrades the tropical depression over the South China Sea to a tropical storm, naming it Sinlaku, as it approaches Hainan.
  - At 19.7°N 129.0°E – The JTWC assesses 03W (Dindo) has slightly deepened to a central pressure of 1,004 hPa (1,004 mbar; 29.65 inHg).
- 06:00 UTC
  - At 20.8°N 127.7°E – The JMA upgrades 03W (Dindo) to a tropical storm, giving it the name, Hagupit, as it turns west-northwestward.
  - At 18.5°N 108.6°E – The JTWC reports Sinlaku has transformed to a tropical storm from being a monsoon depression, after grazing the southern coast of Hainan.
- 18:00 UTC
  - At 22.0°N 126.1°E – The JTWC reports Hagupit (Dindo) has strengthened to a tropical storm, deepening to a lower central pressure of 1,003 hPa (1,003 mbar; 29.62 inHg).
  - (02:00 PHT, August 2) at 22.0°N 126.0°E – The PAGASA also upgrades Hagupit (Dindo) to a tropical storm as it nears Taiwan.

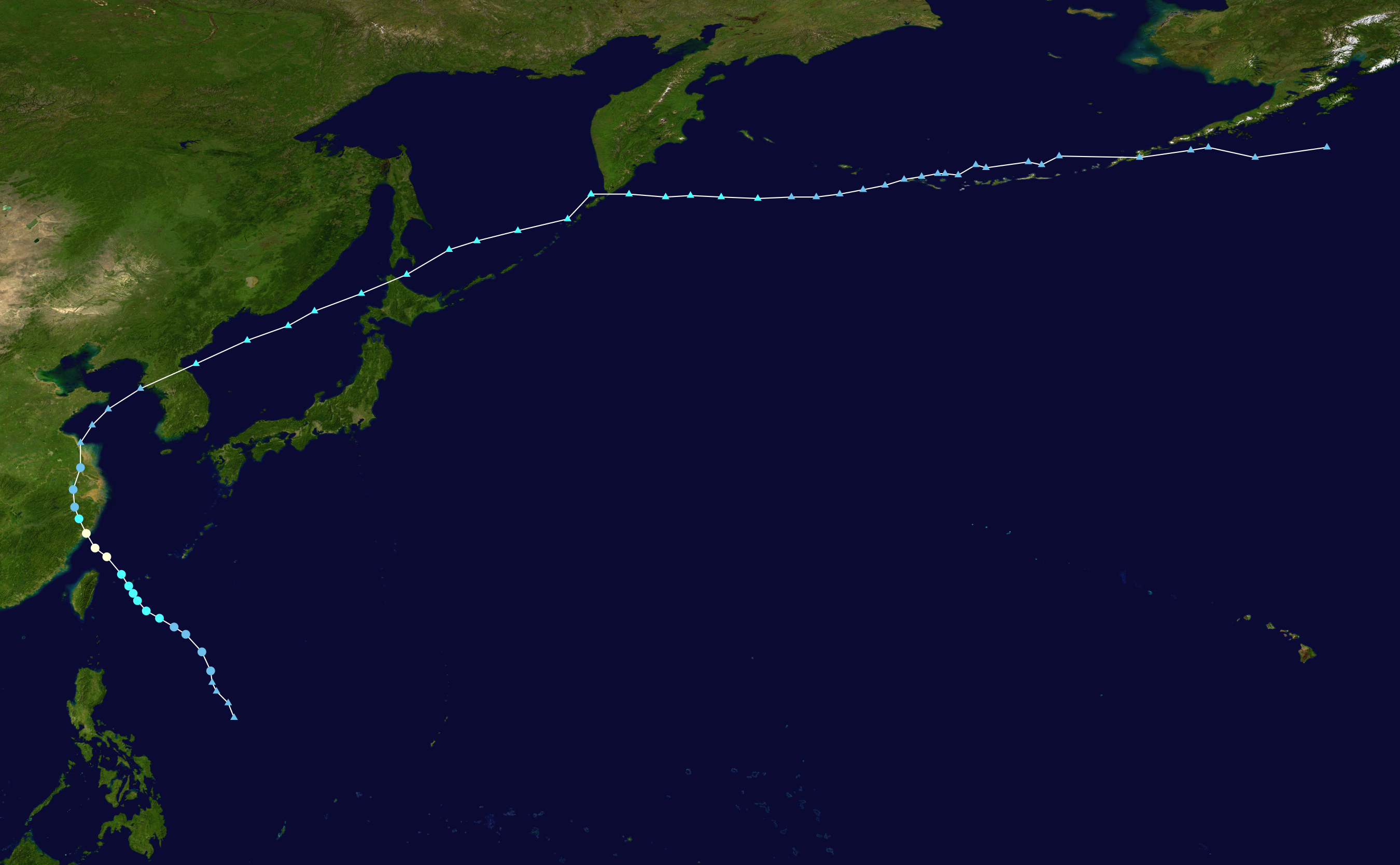
Track of Hagupit during late July to mid August.

August 2

- 00:00 UTC at 19.4°N 106.5°E – The JTWC reports Sinlaku has peaked with 1-minute sustained winds of 45 knots (83 km/h; 52 mph) and a central pressure of 989 hPa (989.0 mbar; 29.21 inHg) now over the Gulf of Tonkin as it is about to hit Vietnam.
- Between 05:00-12:00 UTC (12:00-19:00 ICT) – Sinlaku makes landfall near Nghệ An-Thanh Hóa provinces.
- 06:00 UTC at 19.4°N 106.2°E – The JMA assesses Sinlaku has peaked with 10-minute sustained winds of 40 knots (74 km/h; 46 mph) and a central pressure of 985 hPa (985.0 mbar; 29.09 inHg).
- 12:00 UTC at 19.7°N 104.9°E – The JTWC reports Sinlaku has weakened to a tropical depression.
- 15:00 UTC at 23.9°N 124.0°E – The JMA upgrades Hagupit (Dindo) further to a severe tropical storm as it approaches the vicinity of Yaeyama Islands.
- 18:00 UTC
  - At 24.3°N 123.9°E – Hagupit (Dindo) makes landfall at Iriomote Island, Taketomi, Yaeyama District, Okinawa.
  - (02:00 PHT, August 3) at 24.2°N 124.0°E – The PAGASA upgrades Hagupit (Dindo) further to a severe tropical storm.
  - At 19.2°N 103.4°E – The JMA also downgrades Sinlaku to a tropical depression now over Laos.
  - At 19.2°N 103.1°E – The JTWC reports Sinlaku has weakened further to a tropical disturbance.

Hagupit making landfall in China on August 3.

August 3

- 00:00 UTC
  - (08:00 PHT) at 25.0°N 123.5°E – The PAGASA assesses Hagupit (Dindo) has attained 10-minute winds of 55 knots (102 km/h; 63 mph) and a central pressure of 990 hPa (990.0 mbar; 29.23 inHg) as it is about to exit the PAR.
  - At 20.2°N 102.2°E – The JMA last notes Sinlaku as it moves further inland, with the system dissipating six hours later.
- 01:00 UTC (09:00 PHT) – Hagupit (Dindo) leaves the PAGASA's area of responsibility as it moves northwestward over the East China Sea.
- 06:00 UTC
  - At 26.2°N 122.6°E – The JMA upgrades Hagupit to a typhoon as it nears East China.
  - At 26.2°N 122.5°E – The JTWC determines Hagupit has intensified to a Category 1 typhoon.
- 12:00 UTC
  - At 26.8°N 121.8°E – The JMA assesses Hagupit has peaked with 10-minute winds of 70 knots (130 km/h; 81 mph) and a central pressure of 975 hPa (975.0 mbar; 28.79 inHg).
  - At 26.8°N 121.7°E – The JTWC also reports that Hagupit has peaked, with 1-minute winds of 75 knots (139 km/h; 86 mph) and a central pressure of 971 hPa (971.0 mbar; 28.67 inHg).
- 19:30 UTC (03:30 CST, August 4) at 28.0°N 120.7°E – Typhoon Hagupit hits Wenzhou, Zhejiang.

August 4

- 00:00 UTC
  - At 28.6°N 120.7°E – The JMA reports Hagupit has weakened to a severe tropical storm.
  - At 26.8°N 120.6°E – The JTWC also downgrades Hagupit to a tropical storm.
- 06:00 UTC
  - At 29.7°N 120.4°E – The JMA downgrades Hagupit further to a tropical storm as it continues to move north-northwestward.
  - At 29.6°N 120.3°E – The JTWC assesses that Hagupit has deteriorated further into a tropical depression.

August 5

- 00:00 UTC at 34.0°N 120.7°E – Having emerged over the Yellow Sea, the JTWC reports Hagupit has weakened to a tropical disturbance.
- 12:00 UTC at 36.6°N 122.7°E – The JMA assesses that Hagupit has transitioned to an extratropical cyclone near the Shandong Peninsula.

August 6

- 18:00 UTC at 14.2°N 127.5°E – The JMA marks a tropical depression over the Philippine Sea east of Luzon.

August 7

- 18:00 UTC (02:00 PHT, August 8) at 16.3°N 127.0°E – The PAGASA starts tracking on the tropical depression over the Philippine Sea, designating it Enteng, as it moves northward.

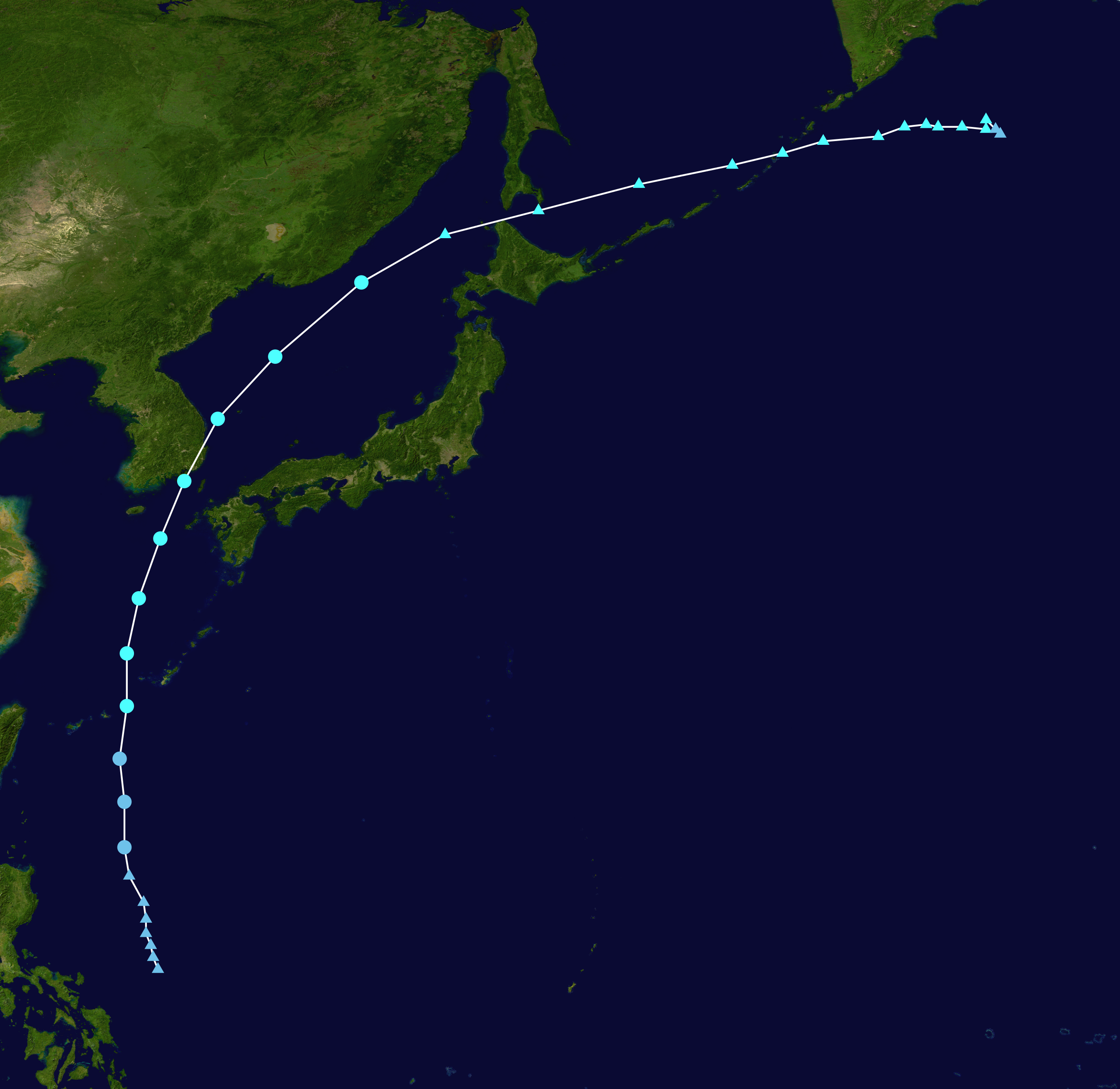
Track of Jangmi during early-mid August.

August 8

- 06:00 UTC at 18.1°N 126.6°E – The JMA assesses Enteng has deepened to a central pressure of 1,000 hPa (1,000 mbar; 29.53 inHg).
- 12:00 UTC at 19.3°N 126.1°E – The JTWC starts tracking on Enteng, designating it as 05W.
- 18:00 UTC
  - At 20.8°N 126.4°E – The JMA reports 05W (Enteng) has strengthened to a tropical storm with the name Jangmi.
  - A tropical depression forms to the west of Minamitorishima with a central pressure of 1,012 hPa (1,012 mbar; 29.88 inHg).

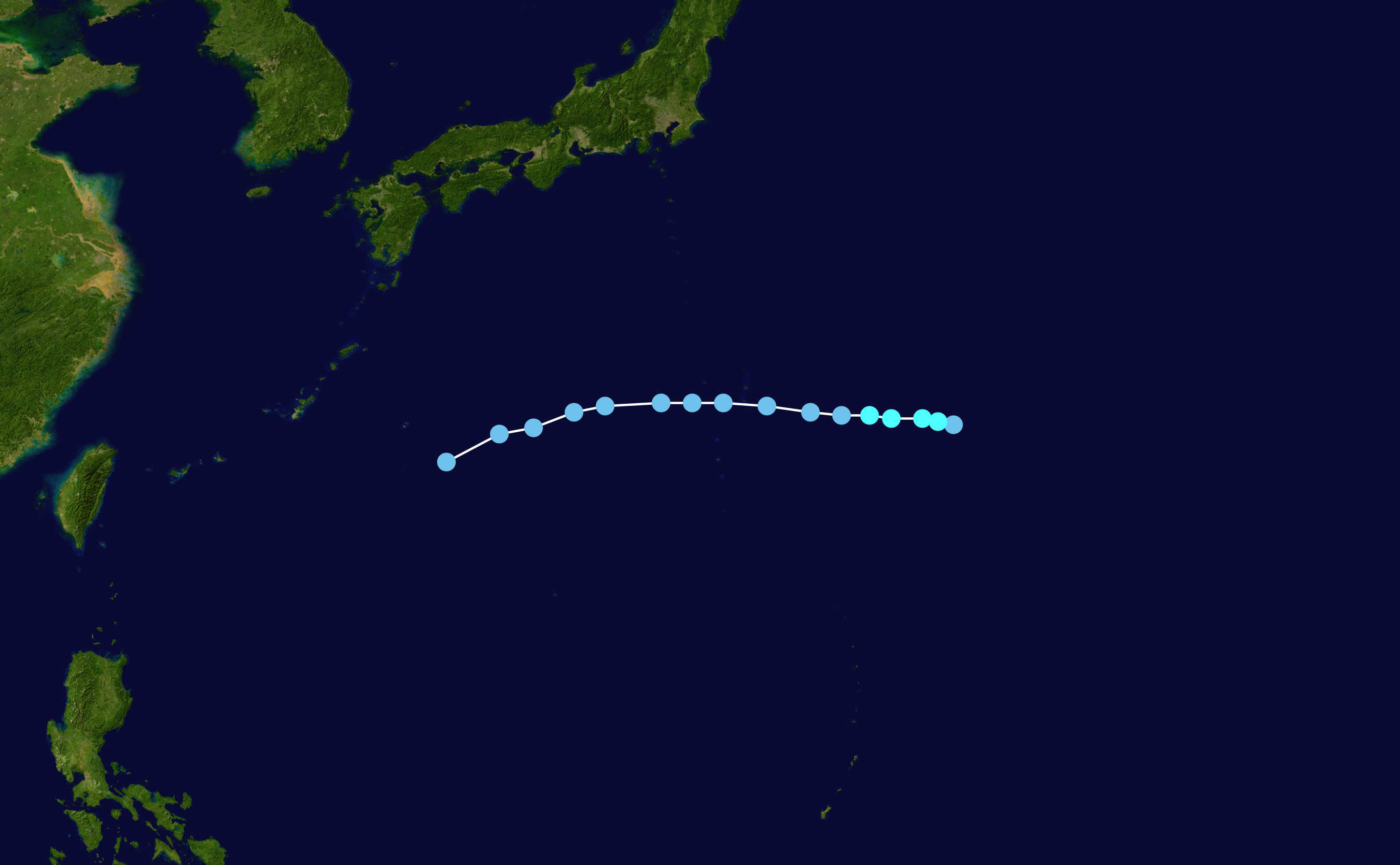
Track of 06W during early-mid August.

August 9

- 00:00 UTC (08:00 PHT)
  - At 15.1°N 118.2°E – The JMA marks another tropical depression west of Luzon near Scarborough Shoal.
  - At 15.2°N 118.0°E – The PAGASA names the tropical depression west of Luzon, Ferdie.
  - At 25.9°N 148.9°E – The JTWC starts tracking the tropical depression west of Minamitorishima, designating it 06W.
  - At 23.0°N 126.1°E – The PAGASA upgrades Jangmi (Enteng) to a tropical storm, with 10-minute winds of 35 knots (65 km/h; 40 mph) and a central pressure of 998 hPa (998.0 mbar; 29.47 inHg).
- 06:00 UTC
  - At 16.0°N 118.3°E – The JMA assesses Ferdie has slightly deepened to a central pressure of 1,000 hPa (1,000 mbar; 29.53 inHg).
  - At 15.9°N 118.3°E – The JTWC starts tracking Ferdie, designating it 07W, as the system moves northward over the South China Sea.
  - At 25.2°N 126.2°E – The JTWC assesses Jangmi (Enteng) has also intensified to a tropical storm as it continues to move northwards.
  - (14:00 PHT) at 25.3°N 126.2°E – The PAGASA reports Jangmi (Enteng) has left the PAR as it passes to the east of Miyako Islands.
  - At 26.0°N 148.4°E – The JTWC upgrades 06W to a tropical storm as it slowly moves westward.
- 12:00 UTC
  - At 27.8°N 126.3°E – The JMA reports Jangmi has peaked with 10-minute winds of 45 knots (83 km/h; 52 mph) and a central pressure of 994 hPa (994.0 mbar; 29.35 inHg) as it turns northeastward over the East China Sea.
  - At 27.4°N 126.2°E – The JTWC assesses that Jangmi has also peaked with 1-minute winds of 40 knots (74 km/h; 46 mph) and a central pressure of 990 hPa (990.0 mbar; 29.23 inHg) northwest of Okinawa Island.
  - At 26.1°N 147.9°E – The JTWC reports 06W has peaked with 1-minute winds of 45 knots (83 km/h; 52 mph) and a central pressure of 1,000 hPa (1,000 mbar; 29.53 inHg).
- 18:00 UTC at 26.1°N 146.9°E – The JMA analyzes 06W has re-attained a central pressure of 1,012 hPa (1,012 mbar; 29.88 inHg).

August 10

- 00:00 UTC
  - At 19.2°N 118.6°E – The JMA reports 07W (Ferdie) has intensified to a tropical storm, naming it Mekkhala.
  - At 19.3°N 118.6°E – The JTWC also upgrades Mekkhala (Ferdie) to a tropical storm.
  - (08:00 PHT) at 19.1°N 118.6°E – The PAGASA follows suit, upgrading Mekkhala (Ferdie) to a tropical storm with 10-minute sustained winds of 35 knots (65 km/h; 40 mph) and a central pressure of 998 hPa (998.0 mbar; 29.47 inHg).
  - At 26.2°N 146.2°E – The JMA determines 06W has attained 10-minute winds of 30 knots (56 km/h; 35 mph).
- 02:00 UTC (10:00 PHT) – The PAGASA reports Mekkhala (Ferdie) has exited their area of responsibility.
- 05:50 UTC (14:50 KST) at 34.9°N 128.6°E – Tropical Storm Jangmi hits Geoje Island, Geoje, South Gyeongsang Province.
- 06:00 UTC
  - At 34.6°N 128.6°E – The JTWC determines Jangmi has slightly deepened to a central pressure of 991 hPa (991.0 mbar; 29.26 inHg) as it impacts South Korea.
  - At 26.2°N 145.3°E – The JTWC downgrades 06W back to a tropical depression as it approaches the Bonin Islands.
- 18:00 UTC
  - At 22.9°N 118.3°E – The JMA upgrades Mekkhala to a severe tropical storm, simultaneously peaking with 10-minute sustained winds of 50 knots (93 km/h; 58 mph) and a central pressure of 992 hPa (992.0 mbar; 29.29 inHg).
  - At 22.9°N 118.2°E – The JTWC reports Mekkhala has further intensified to a Category 1 typhoon.
  - At 39.8°N 132.4°E – Now over the Sea of Japan, the JTWC reports Jangmi has turned extratropical.
- 21:00 UTC at 23.5°N 118.0°E – The JTWC analyzes that Mekkhala has peaked with 1-minute sustained winds of 70 knots (130 km/h; 81 mph) and a central pressure of 980 hPa (980.0 mbar; 28.94 inHg) as it is about to make landfall in China.
- 23:30 UTC (07:30 CST, August 11) at 24.1°N 117.6°E – Mekkhala hits Zhangpu County, Zhangzhou, Fujian.

Mekkhala after making landfall on China on August 11.

August 11

- 00:00 UTC at 24.2°N 117.7°E – The JMA downgrades Mekkhala to a tropical storm after making landfall.
- 06:00 UTC
  - At 25.6°N 117.3°E – The JMA reports Mekkhala has weakened to a tropical depression, with the system dissipating six hours later.
  - At 25.5°N 117.3°E – The JTWC downgrades Mekkhala to a tropical storm as it moves further inland.
  - At 44.3°N 139.5°E – The JMA reports Jangmi has completed its extratropical transition as it accelerates near Hokkaido.
- 12:00 UTC at 26.6°N 139.5°E – The JTWC reports 06W has slightly deepened to a central pressure of 1,008 hPa (1,008 mbar; 29.77 inHg) after moving south of the Bonin Islands as it turns to the west-southwest.
- 18:00 UTC at 28.3°N 115.9°E – The JTWC downgrades Ex-Mekkhala further to a tropical depression now over Jiangxi Province.

August 12

- 00:00 UTC at 28.7°N 114.6°E – The JTWC determines Ex-Mekkhala has weakened further to a tropical disturbance inland.
- 06:00 UTC at 52.3°N 179.3°W – The JMA stops tracking the extratropical remnants of Hagupit near the Aleutian Islands after it had crossed the IDL.
- 12:00 UTC at 25.6°N 134.3°E – The JTWC assesses 06W has deepened to a lower central pressure of 1,007 hPa (1,007 mbar; 29.74 inHg) as it is about to enter the PAR.
- 14:00 UTC (22:00 PHT) – The PAGASA reports 06W has entered the PAR, naming it Gener.
- 18:00 UTC (02:00 PHT, August 13) at 24.7°N 132.6°E – The JTWC stops tracking 06W (Gener) as it dissipates over the Philippine Sea. The PAGASA assesses the system with 10-minute winds of 25 knots (46 km/h; 29 mph) and a central pressure of 1,012 hPa (1,012 mbar; 29.88 inHg).

August 13

- 00:00 UTC (08:00 PHT) at 24.5°N 131.5°E – The JMA stops tracking Gener as it dissipates six hours later while the PAGASA reports the system has degenerated to a remnant low near Okidaitōjima.

August 16

- 06:00 UTC at 17.6°N 123.4°E – A tropical depression forms near northeastern Luzon.

August 17

- 00:00 UTC (08:00 PHT) at 19.0°N 121.9°E – The PAGASA starts tracking the tropical depression formerly near northeastern Luzon, naming it Helen, developing over Camiguin Island in Calayan, Cagayan.
- 12:00 UTC
  - At 19.7°N 119.5°E – The JTWC recognizes Helen, labelling it 08W, as it moves west-northwestward over the South China Sea.
  - (20:00 PHT) at 19.7°N 119.4°E – The PAGASA assesses 08W (Helen) has attained its within-PAR peak with 10-minute winds of 30 knots (56 km/h; 35 mph) and a central pressure of 1,004 hPa (1,004 mbar; 29.65 inHg).
- 15:00 UTC (23:00 PHT) – The PAGASA reports 08W (Helen) has exited the PAR.

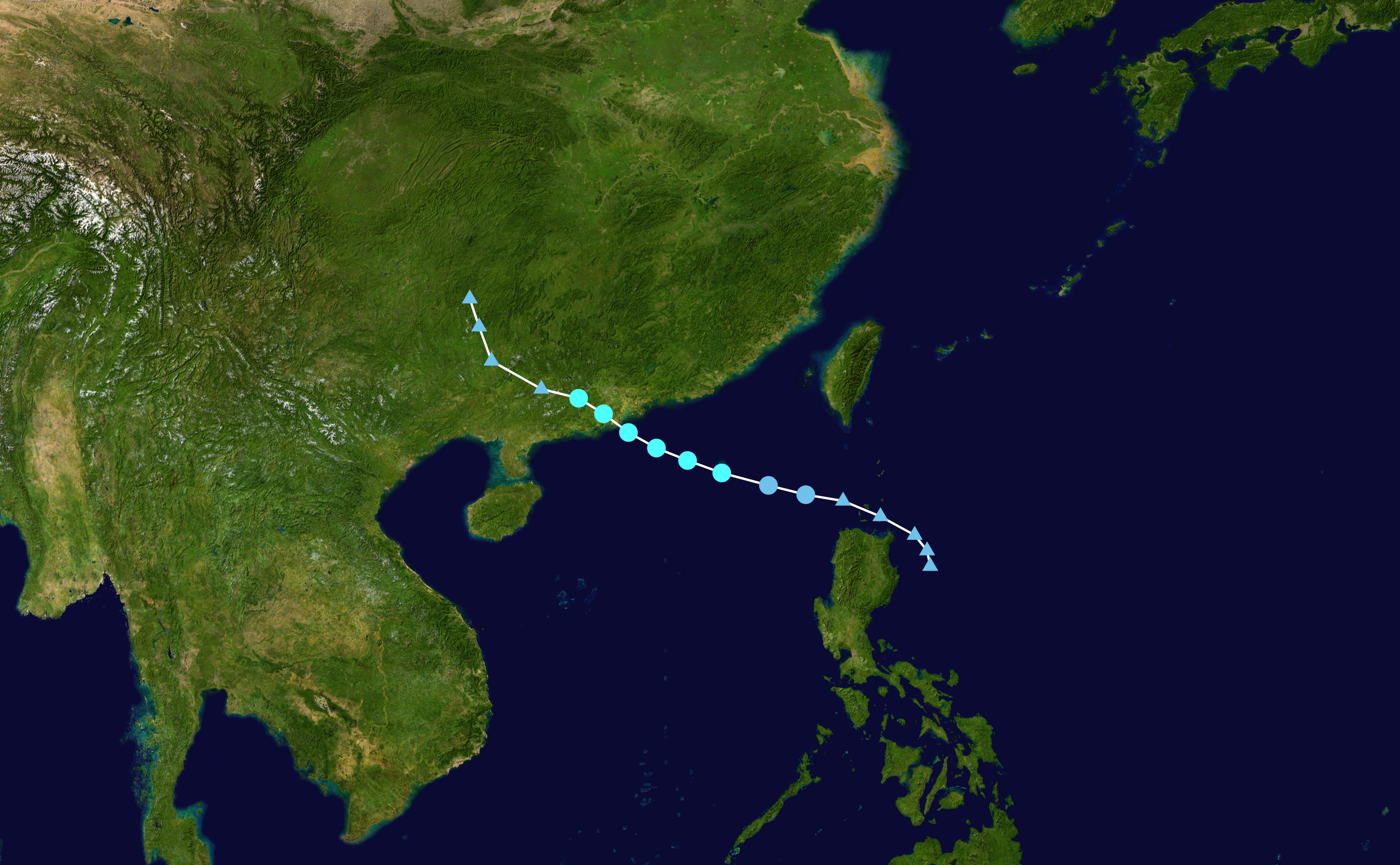
Track of Higos during mid-late August.

August 18

- 00:00 UTC
  - At 20.3°N 116.9°E – The JMA upgrades 08W to a tropical storm, naming it Higos.
  - At 20.4°N 116.8°E – The JTWC follows suit, upgrading Higos to a tropical storm.
- 18:00 UTC
  - At 21.6°N 113.8°E – The JMA upgrades Higos further to a severe tropical storm as it nears landfall in southern China.
  - At 21.7°N 113.8°E – The JTWC analyzes that Higos has peaked with 1-minute winds of 60 knots (110 km/h; 69 mph) and a central pressure of 988 hPa (988.0 mbar; 29.18 inHg).
- 22:00 UTC (06:00 CST, August 19) at 22.3°N 113.6°E – Higos hits Zhuhai, Guangdong.

August 19

- 00:00 UTC at 22.2°N 113.0°E – The JMA reports Higos has peaked with 10-minute winds of 55 knots (102 km/h; 63 mph) and a central pressure of 992 hPa (992.0 mbar; 29.29 inHg).
- 06:00 UTC at 22.8°N 112.0°E – The JMA downgrades Higos to a tropical storm as it succumbs to land interaction.
- 12:00 UTC at 23.1°N 111.0°E – The JTWC reports Higos has deteriorated to a tropical disturbance over Guangxi Province.
- 18:00 UTC at 24.0°N 109.4°E – The JMA downgrades Higos further to a tropical depression as it moves further inland.

August 20

- 06:00 UTC at 26.0°N 108.7°E – The JMA last notes Higos as it dissipates six hours later over Guizhou Province.
- 18:00 UTC at 18.7°N 122.8°E – The JMA tracks another tropical depression near northeastern Luzon with a central pressure of 1,006 hPa (1,006 mbar; 29.71 inHg).

August 21

- 00:00 UTC (08:00 PHT) at 20.2°N 122.3°E – The PAGASA recognizes the tropical depression near northeastern Luzon, designating it Igme, while located near Batanes.
- 12:00 UTC at 22.0°N 122.3°E – The JTWC assigns Igme the identifier, 09W, now moving northward near Taiwan.

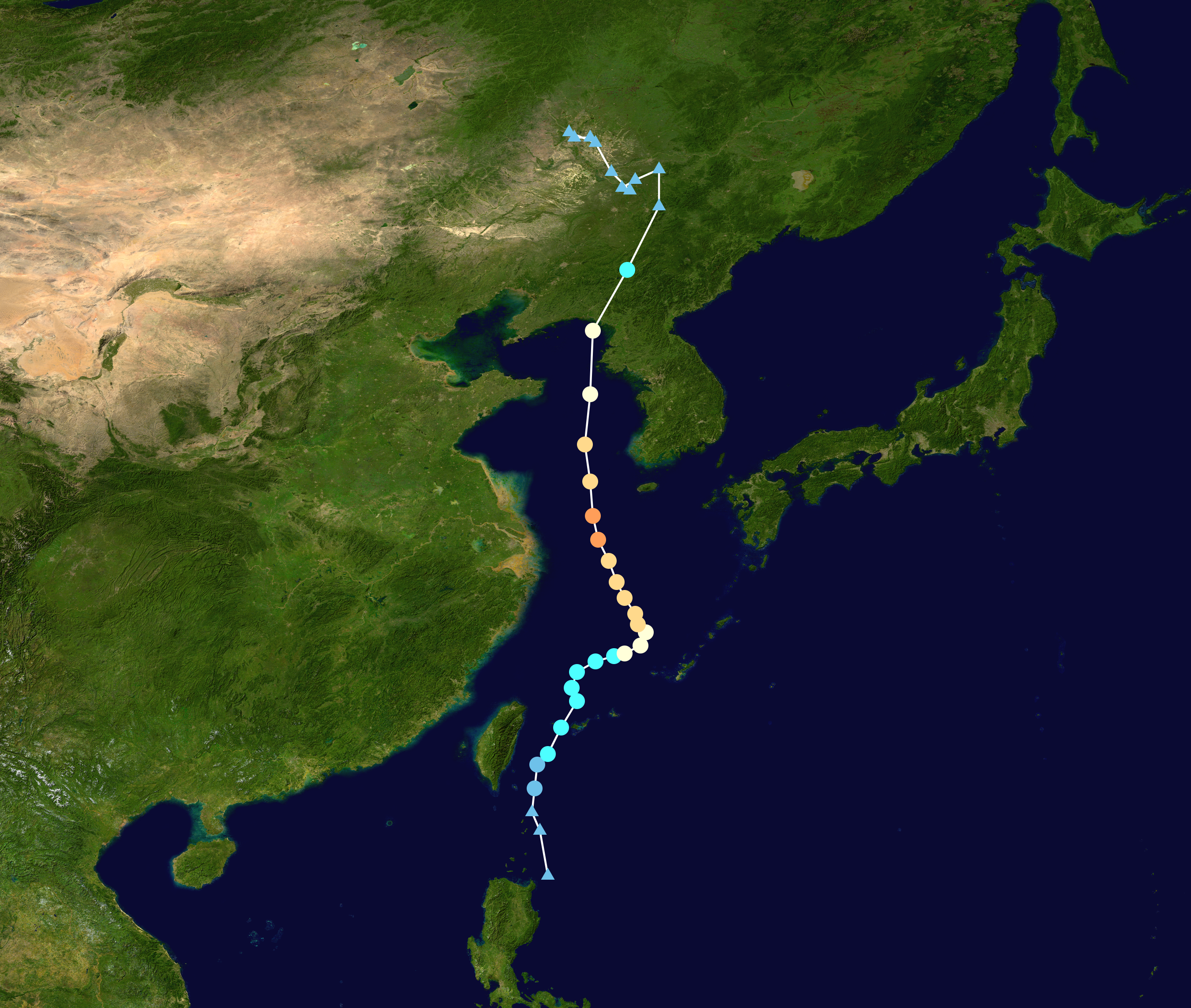
Track of Bavi during late August.

August 22

- 00:00 UTC
  - At 23.4°N 122.6°E – The JMA reports 09W (Igme) has intensified to a tropical storm, gaining the name Bavi.
  - At 23.3°N 122.8°E – The JTWC also upgrades Bavi (igme) to a tropical storm as it moves northeastward.
  - (08:00 PHT) at 23.4°N 122.7°E – The PAGASA follows suit, upgrading Bavi (Igme) to a tropical storm.
- 06:00 UTC (14:00 PHT) at 24.3°N 123.5°E – The PAGASA assesses Bavi (Igme) with 10-minute winds of 45 knots (83 km/h; 52 mph) and a central pressure of 994 hPa (994.0 mbar; 29.35 inHg) as it makes its closest approach to the Yaeyama Islands.
- 09:00 UTC at 24.7°N 123.7°E – The JMA upgrades Bavi (Igme) to a severe tropical storm while the JTWC assesses the system has deepened to a central pressure of 989 hPa (989.0 mbar; 29.21 inHg) as it enters the East China Sea.
- 11:00 UTC (19:00 PHT) – The PAGASA reports Bavi (Igme) has exited the PAR.

August 23

- 18:00 UTC at 27.1°N 125.7°E – The JTWC further upgrades Bavi to a Category 1 typhoon as it slowly moves to the east-northeast.

August 24

- 00:00 UTC at 27.3°N 126.1°E – The JMA reports Bavi has strengthened to a typhoon as it gradually turns to the north.
- 12:00 UTC at 28.2°N 126.2°E – Typhoon Bavi strengthens further to a Category 2 typhoon as it accelerates to the north-northwest.

August 25

- 18:00 UTC at 31.4°N 124.7°E – The JTWC assesses that Bavi has strengthened further to a Category 3 typhoon, simultaneously attaining its maximum 1-minute sustained winds of 100 knots (190 km/h; 120 mph) as it continues moving north-northwestward.

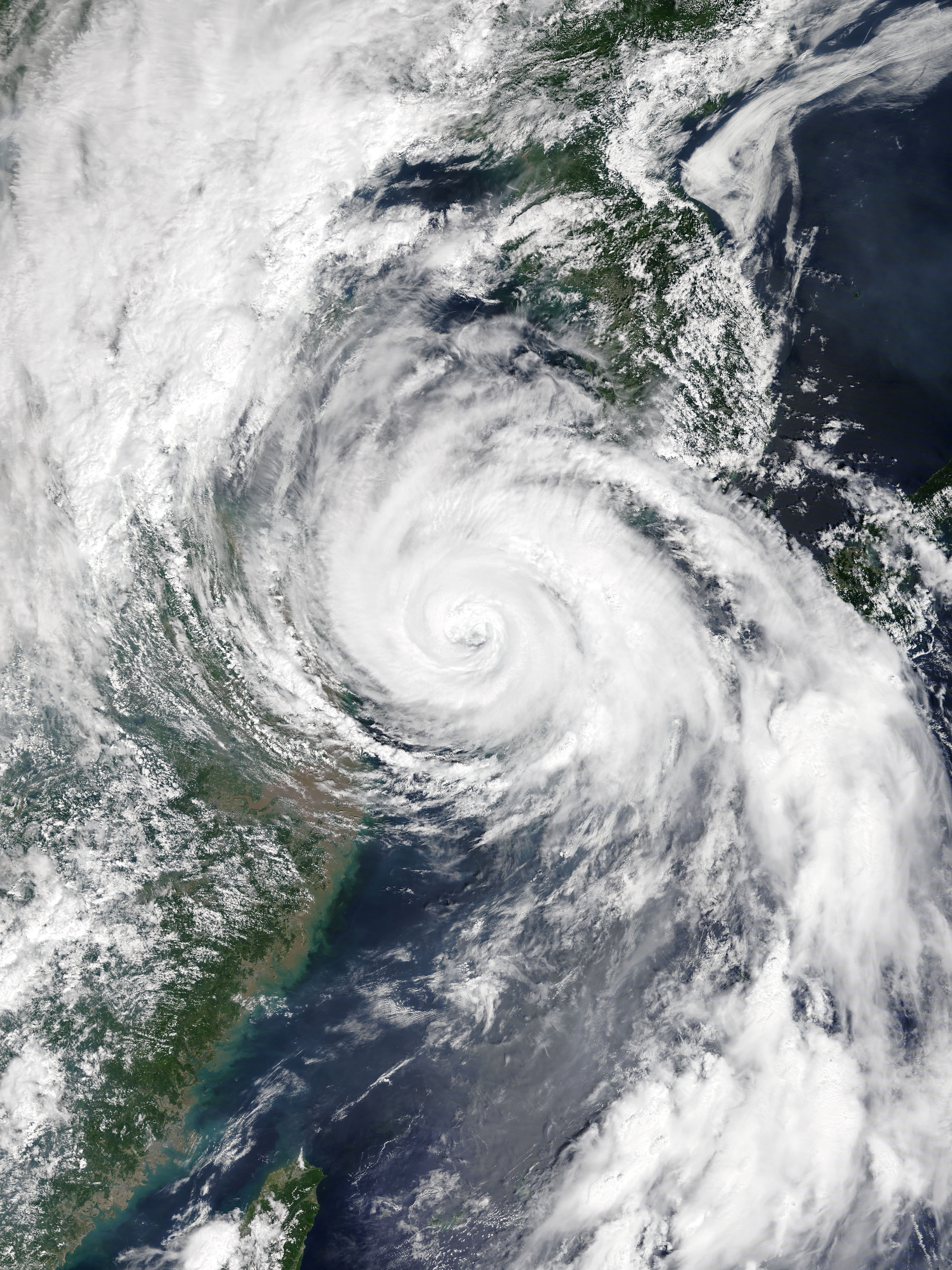
Bavi at its peak intensity moving over the East China Sea on August 26.

August 26

- 00:00 UTC
  - At 32.4°N 124.5°E – The JMA reports Bavi has peaked with 10-minute sustained winds of 85 knots (157 km/h; 98 mph) and a central pressure of 950 hPa (950.0 mbar; 28.05 inHg).
  - At 32.3°N 124.5°E – While maintaining its intensity, the JTWC assesses that Bavi has attained its lowest central pressure of 942 hPa (942.0 mbar; 27.82 inHg).
- 06:00 UTC at 33.6°N 124.4°E – The JTWC reports Bavi has weakened and is now a Category 2 typhoon as it enters the Yellow Sea.
- 18:00 UTC at 36.9°N 124.4°E – The JTWC downgrades Bavi further to a Category 1 typhoon as it moves further north and is nearing North Korea.

Bavi making landfall on North Korea on August 26-27.

August 27

- 00:00 UTC
  - At 39.1°N 125.3°E – The JMA downgrades Bavi to a severe tropical storm as it undergoes extratropical transition.
  - At 14.8°N 132.3°E – The JMA marks a tropical depression over the Philippine Sea.
- 00:30 UTC (09:30 PYT) at 40.1°N 124.4°E – Bavi hits North Pyongan Province.
- 06:00 UTC
  - At 42.0°N 125.0°E – The JMA reports Bavi has finished its transition to an extratropical system over northeastern China.
  - At 41.6°N 125.8°E – The JTWC downgrades Bavi to a tropical storm as it moves further north.
  - (14:00 PHT) at 15.3°N 131.9°E – The PAGASA starts tracking the tropical depression over the Philippine Sea, naming it Julian.
- 12:00 UTC at 44.0°N 127.0°E – The JTWC downgrades Bavi further to a tropical disturbance over Jilin Province.

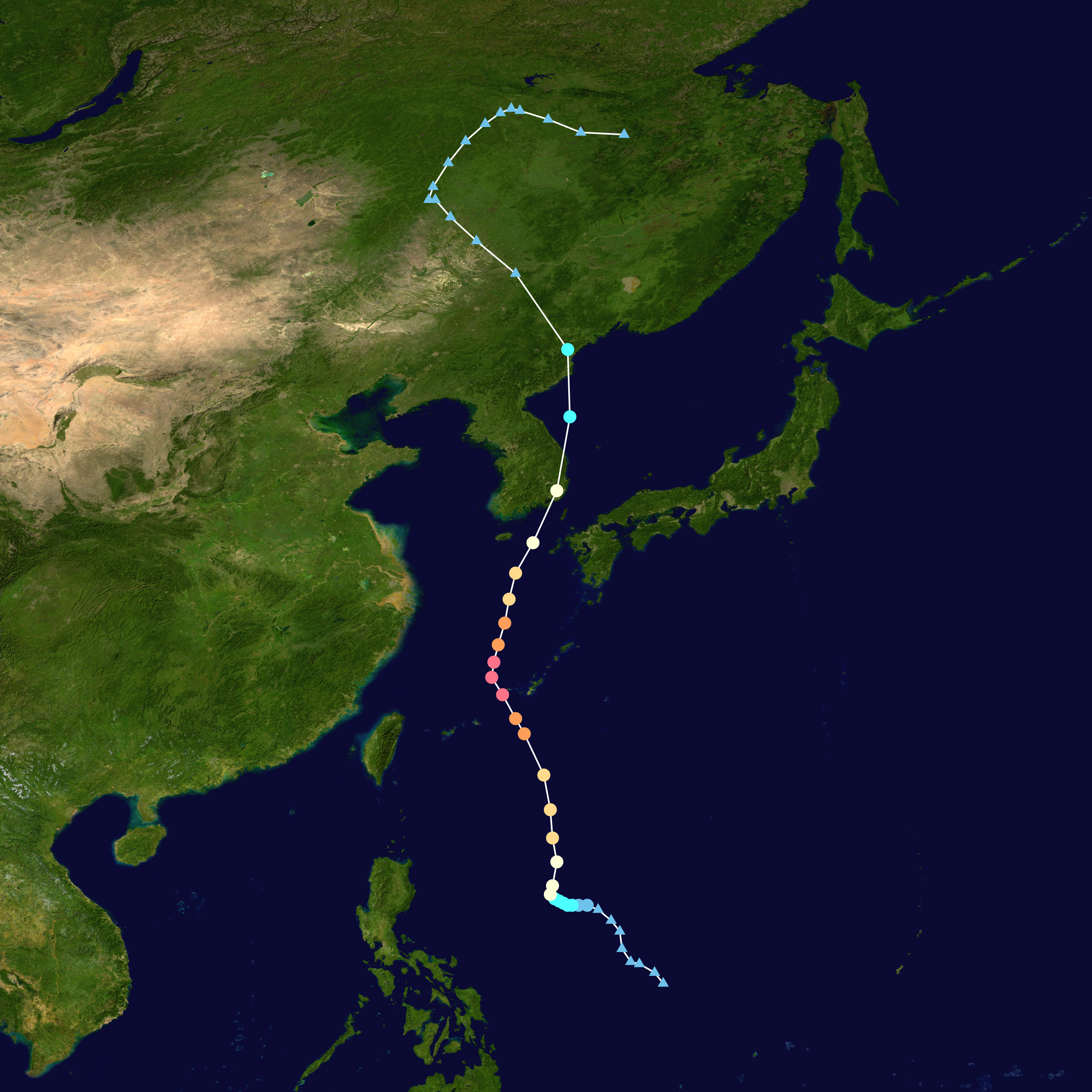
Track of Maysak during late August to early September.

August 28

- 00:00 UTC at 16.4°N 130.4°E – The JTWC begins tracking Julian, designating it 10W, as it decelerates while moving westward.
- 06:00 UTC (14:00 PHT) at 17.2°N 130.2°E – The JMA and PAGASA report 10W (Julian) has strengthened to a tropical storm, with the former naming the system Maysak.
- 12:00 UTC at 16.4°N 129.7°E – The JTWC also upgrades Maysak (Julian) to a tropical storm as it slowly moves over the Philippine Sea.
- 18:00 UTC
  - At 16.5°N 129.7°E – The JMA upgrades Maysak (Julian) further to a severe tropical storm.
  - (02:00 PHT, August 29) at 16.4°N 129.7°E – The PAGASA follows suit, upgrading Maysak (Julian) to a severe tropical storm.

August 29

- 06:00 UTC at 16.6°N 129.1°E – The JTWC reports Maysak (Julian) has slightly deepened to a central pressure of 984 hPa (984.0 mbar; 29.06 inHg) as it slowly turns northward.
- 12:00 UTC
  - At 17.0°N 129.0°E – The JMA reports Maysak (Julian) has strengthened further to a typhoon.
  - (20:00 PHT) at 16.7°N 129.0°E – The PAGASA also upgrades Maysak (Julian) to a typhoon.
- 18:00 UTC
  - At 16.9°N 128.7°E – The JTWC reports Maysak (Julian) has intensified further to a Category 1 typhoon.
  - At 46.6°N 124.4°E – The JMA stops tracking the extratropical remnants of Bavi as it dissipates over Heilongjiang Province early the next day.

August 30

- 12:00 UTC
  - At 19.5°N 128.8°E – The JTWC further upgrades Maysak (Julian) to a Category 2 typhoon while moving north-northwestwards at a slightly faster pace.
  - At 24.9°N 145.5°E – The JMA reports a tropical depression has formed southeast of the Bonin Islands.

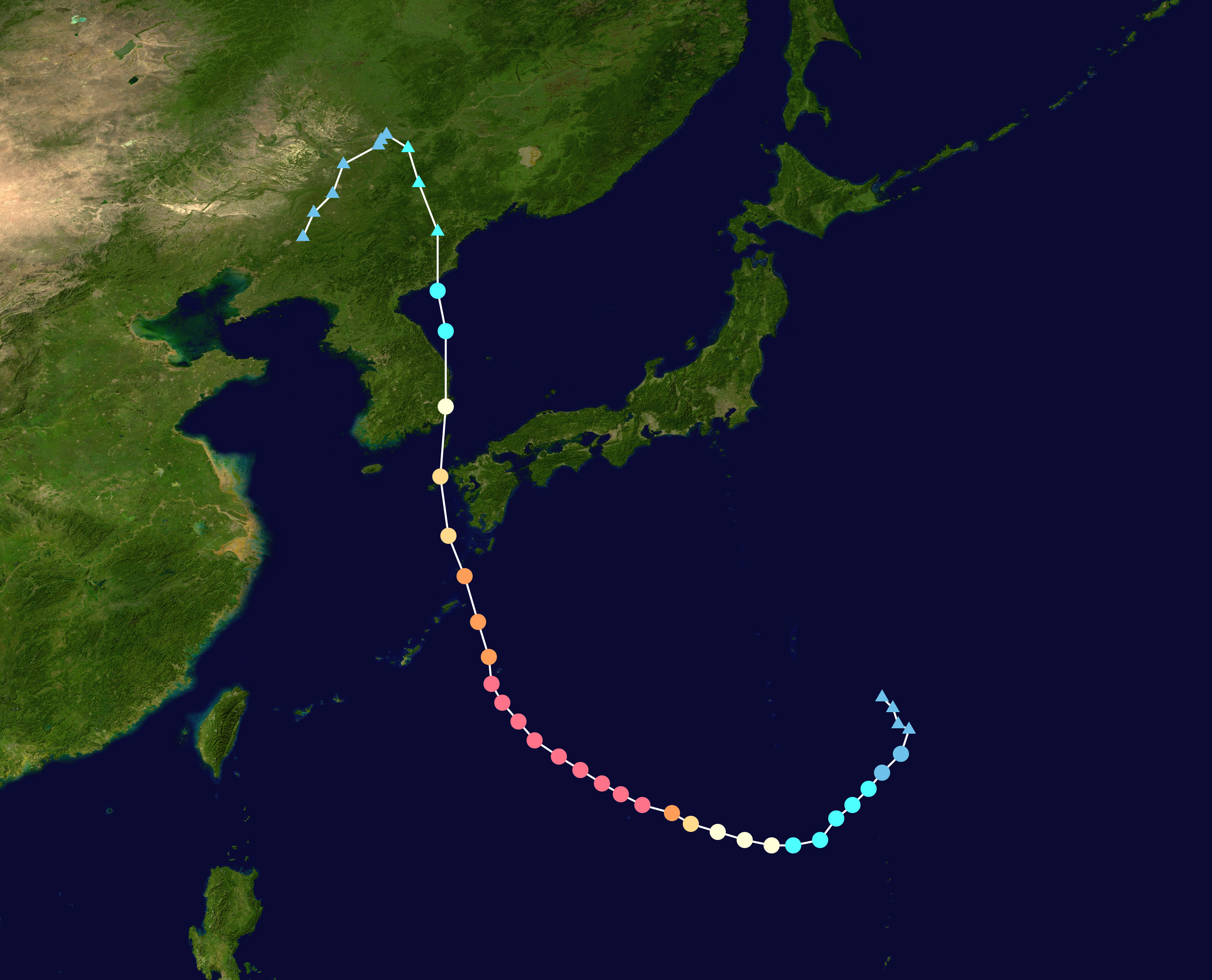
Track of Haishen during late August to early September.

August 31

- 06:00 UTC at 24.3°N 127.5°E – Typhoon Maysak (Julian) continues intensifying and is now a Category 3 typhoon as it nears the Okinawa Archipelago.
- 12:00 UTC
  - (20:00 PHT) at 25.0°N 127.1°E – The PAGASA assesses Maysak (Julian) with 10-minute sustained winds of 90 knots (170 km/h; 100 mph) and a central pressure of 940 hPa (940.0 mbar; 27.76 inHg) as it is about to exit the PAR.
  - At 22.6°N 145.9°E – The JMA reports the tropical depression southeast of the Bonin Islands has strengthened to a tropical storm, gaining the name Haishen.
  - At 22.8°N 146.2°E – The JTWC starts monitoring Haishen as a tropical depression as it moves southwestwards.
- 13:00 UTC (21:00 PHT) – Typhoon Maysak (Julian) exits PAGASA's monitoring area.
- 18:00 UTC at 26.1°N 126.5°E – The JTWC upgrades Maysak further to a Category 4 typhoon as it passes close to Kume Island.

=== September ===
Maysak near its peak intensity traversing the East China Sea and affecting the Ryukyu Islands on September 1.

September 1

- 00:00 UTC
  - At 26.9°N 126.0°E – The JMA and JTWC report Maysak has peaked with 10-minute sustained winds of 95 knots (176 km/h; 109 mph) and a central pressure of 935 hPa (935.0 mbar; 27.61 inHg) and 1-minute sustained winds of 120 knots (220 km/h; 140 mph) and a central pressure of 930 hPa (930.0 mbar; 27.46 inHg), respectively, as it moves over the East China Sea.
  - At 21.5°N 145.0°E – The JTWC upgrades Haishen to a tropical storm.
- 12:00 UTC at 28.4°N 126.3°E – The JTWC reports Maysak has leveled off from its peak and is back to a Category 3 typhoon as it moves north-northeastward.
- 18:00 UTC at 20.0°N 143.3°E – After making a close pass to Farallón de Pájaros, the JMA upgrades Haishen further to a severe tropical storm.

September 2

- 00:00 UTC at 30.5°N 126.8°E – The JTWC downgrades Maysak further to a Category 2 typhoon.
- 06:00 UTC
  - At 19.3°N 141.5°E – The JMA reports Haishen has rapidly strengthened to a typhoon as it turns to the west-northwest.
  - At 19.4°N 141.4°E – The JTWC also upgrades Haishen to a Category 1 typhoon, deepening to a central pressure of 985 hPa (985.0 mbar; 29.09 inHg).
- 12:00 UTC at 33.1°N 127.9°E – The JTWC reports Maysak has weakened further to a Category 1 typhoon as it moves towards South Korea.
- 17:20 UTC (02:20 KST, September 3) at 35.2°N 129.1°E – Typhoon Maysak makes landfall on Busan.

September 3

- 00:00 UTC
  - At 38.9°N 129.6°E – Now over the Sea of Japan, the JTWC reports Maysak has weakened further to a tropical storm as it turns to the north-northwest.
  - At 20.2°N 138.4°E – The JTWC upgrades Haishen further to a Category 2 typhoon as it continues moving west-northwestwards.
- Between 00:00-06:00 UTC (09:00-15:00 PYT) at 40.8°N 129.5°E – Maysak makes another landfall on Hwadae County, North Hamgyong Province.
- 06:00 UTC
  - At 20.6°N 137.7°E – Typhoon Haishen continues to rapidly intensify and is now a Category 3 typhoon, per the JTWC.
  - At 42.3°N 129.1°E – The JMA reports Maysak has turned extratropical after making landfall on North Korea.
- 12:00 UTC
  - At 20.9°N 136.6°E – Typhoon Haishen becomes a Category 4 typhoon as it traverses the Philippine Sea.
  - At 45.5°N 127.1°E – The JTWC reports Maysak has completed its extratropical transition over northeastern China.

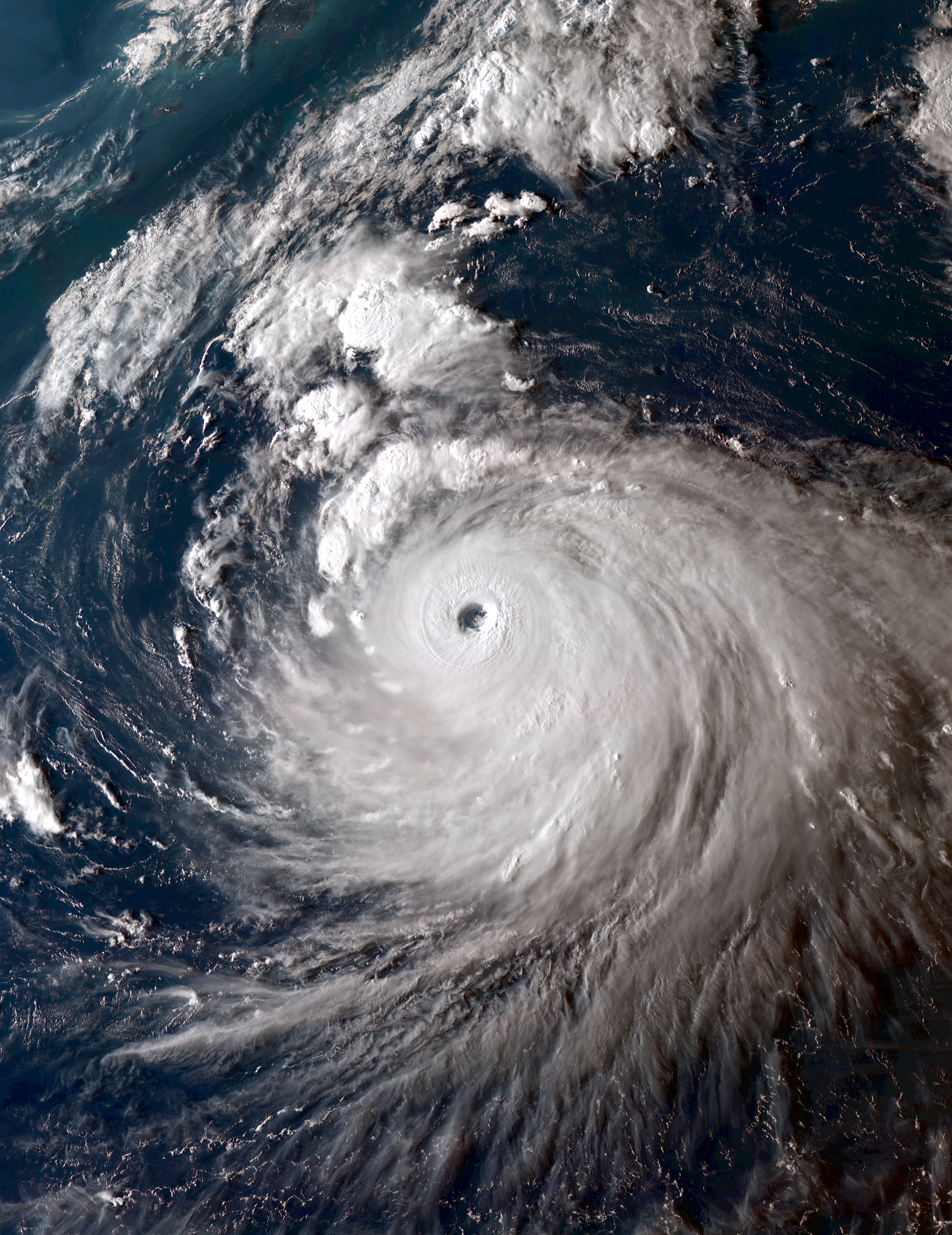
Haishen near its peak intensity moving over the Philippine Sea on September 4.

September 4

- 00:00 UTC at 21.7°N 135.1°E – The JTWC upgrades Haishen to a Category 4 super typhoon as it nears the PAR.
- 01:00 UTC (09:00 PHT) – The PAGASA reports Haishen has entered the PAR as a super-typhoon, naming it Kristine. (Note: Since March 23, 2022, PAGASA has defined a super-typhoon as a tropical cyclone with maximum 10-minute sustained winds of ≥185 kilometres per hour (100 kn; 51 m/s; 115 mph). This update has been reflected in the agency's annual reports of tropical cyclones starting in 2020.)
- 06:00 UTC at 22.2°N 134.3°E – The JTWC assesses Haishen (Kristine) has peaked as a high-end Category 4 super typhoon with 1-minute sustained winds of 135 knots (250 km/h; 155 mph) and a central pressure of 915 hPa (915.0 mbar; 27.02 inHg).
- 12:00 UTC (20:00 PHT) at 22.7°N 133.5°E – The JMA and PAGASA both analyze Haishen (Kristine) peaking with 10-minute sustained winds of 105 knots (194 km/h; 121 mph) and a central pressure of 910 hPa (910.0 mbar; 26.87 inHg).
- 18:00 UTC at 23.3°N 132.6°E – After a brief rise in central pressure, the JTWC reports Haishen (Kristine) has deepened to its lowest at 913 hPa (913.0 mbar; 26.96 inHg).

September 5

- 06:00 UTC at 24.7°N 131.4°E – The JTWC reports Haishen (Kristine) has weakened below super typhoon status near Okidaitōjima.
- 10:00 UTC (18:00 PHT) – The PAGASA reports Super Typhoon Haishen (Kristine) has exited the PAR as it turns to the north-northwest.
- 18:00 UTC at 26.4°N 130.9°E – The JTWC downgrades Haishen to a Category 3 typhoon after passing close to the northern Daitō Islands.

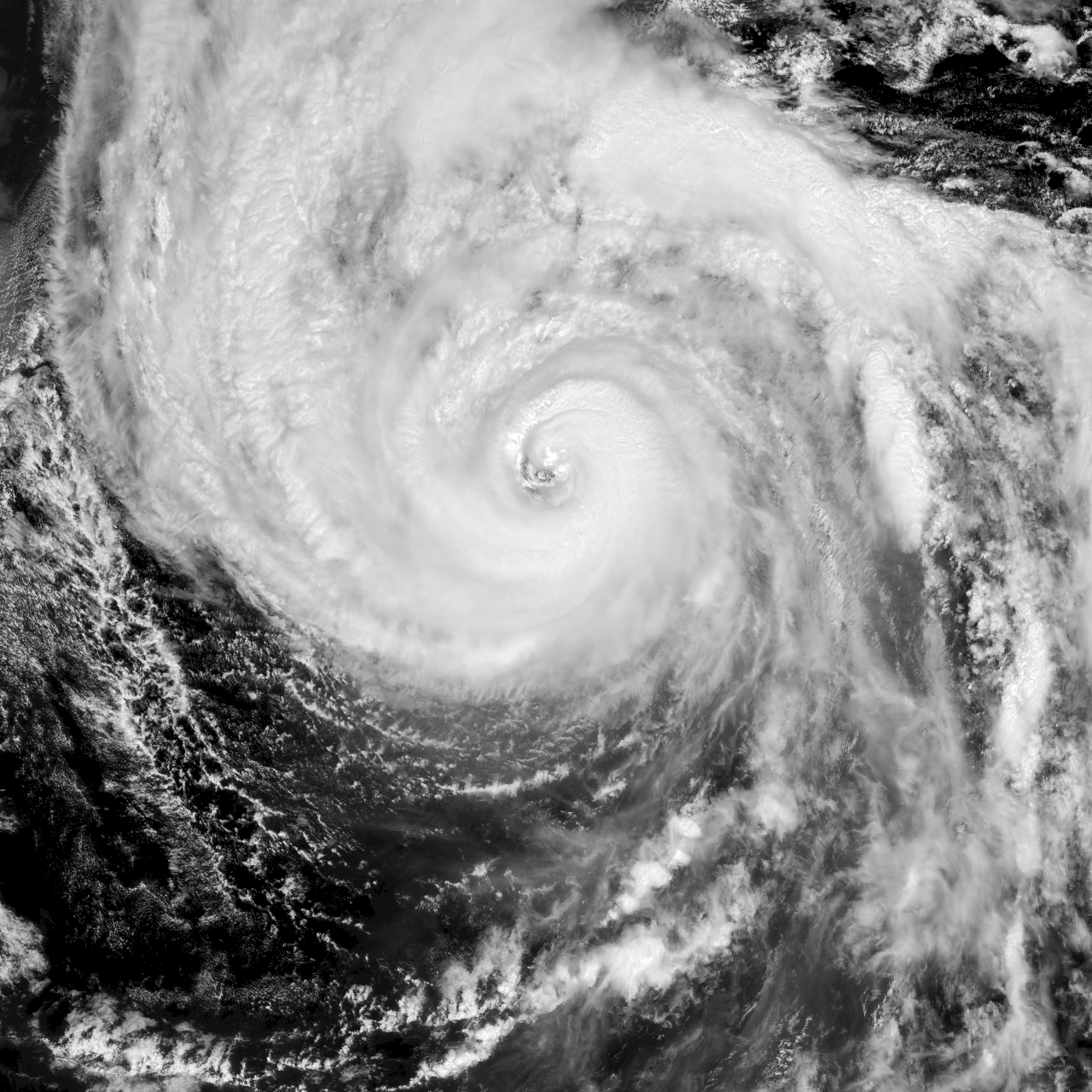
Haishen raking the Satsunan Islands on September 6.

September 6

- 08:00 UTC (17:00 JST) at 30.0°N 129.9°E – Typhoon Haishen makes a direct hit on Kuchinoshima of the Tokara Islands, Toshima, Kagoshima District, Kagoshima.
- 12:00 UTC at 30.9°N 129.4°E – The JTWC downgrades Haishen further to a Category 2 typhoon near the Kusagaki Islets.
- 18:00 UTC (03:00 JST, September 7) at 32.9°N 129.0°E – Typhoon Haishen makes another landfall on Wakamatsu Island of the Gotō Islands, Shin-Kamigotō, Minami-Matsuura District, Nagasaki.

September 7

- 00:00 UTC
  - (09:00 KST) at 35.5°N 129.2°E – After crossing the Korea Strait, Typhoon Haishen makes its third landfall on Ulsan.
  - At 35.7°N 129.3°E – The JTWC reports Haishen has weakened further to a Category 1 typhoon upon hitting land.
  - At 51.9°N 132.1°E – After days of moving in a clockwise direction over northeastern China and Russian Far East, the JMA stops tracking the extratropical remnants of Maysak as it dissipates six hours later near the border of Amur Oblast and Khabarovsk Krai.
- 03:00 UTC at 36.9°N 129.3°E – The JMA downgrades Haishen to a severe tropical storm as it is about to emerge over the Sea of Japan.
- 06:00 UTC at 38.5°N 129.3°E – Haishen degenerates further to a tropical storm as it continues to move northwards, per the JTWC.
- 12:00 UTC at 39.8°N 128.9°E – The JMA assesses that Haishen has weakened to a tropical storm as it is about to hit North Korea.
- 12:30 UTC (21:30 PYT) at 40.3°N 128.6°E – Haishen makes its final hit on Riwŏn County, South Hamgyong Province.
- 18:00 UTC
  - At 42.2°N 129.0°E – The JMA reports Haishen has turned extratropical near the China-North Korea border.
  - At 42.9°N 129.1°E – The JTWC also determines Haishen has finished its extratropical transition.

September 10

- 00:00 UTC – A tropical depression forms near the Bonin Islands.
- 06:00 UTC
  - At 25.7°N 142.5°E – The JMA assesses that the tropical depression near the Bonin Islands has slightly deepened to a central pressure of 1,006 hPa (1,006 mbar; 29.71 inHg).
  - At 42.0°N 124.0°E – The JMA last notes the extratropical remnants of Haishen as it dissipates six hours later over Liaoning Province.

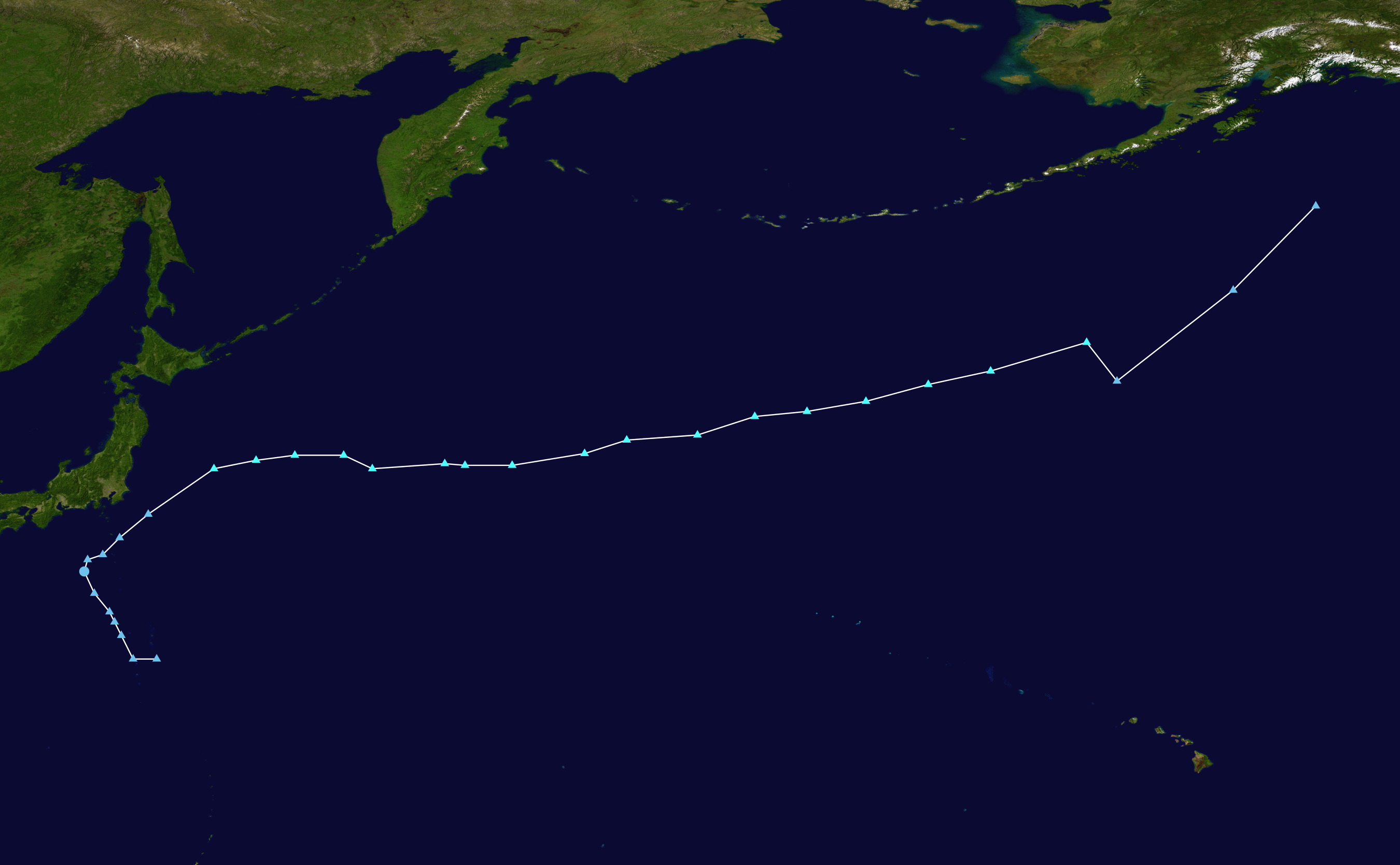
Track of 12W during mid-September.

September 11

- 06:00 UTC at 28.5°N 139.7°E – After briefly rising, the JMA assesses that the tropical depression's central pressure has dipped to 1,008 hPa (1,008 mbar; 29.77 inHg) as the system moves northwest of the Bonin Islands.
- 18:00 UTC at 30.9°N 138.2°E – The JTWC starts tracking the tropical depression northwest of the Bonin Islands, designating it 12W, with 1-minute winds of 25 knots (46 km/h; 29 mph) and a central pressure of 1,004 hPa (1,004 mbar; 29.65 inHg).

September 12

- 00:00 UTC at 31.6°N 138.4°E – The JTWC determines 12W has weakened back to a tropical disturbance northwest of Tori-shima.
- 18:00 UTC at 34.3°N 142.0°E – The JMA reports Ex-12W has turned extratropical near the southeast coast of Japan.

September 15

- 00:00 UTC (08:00 PHT) at 12.8°N 121.8°E – The JMA and PAGASA report the formation of a tropical depression over Tablas Strait, with the latter naming it Leon, which had been traversing the Philippines.
- 01:30 UTC (09:30 PHT) at 12.7°N 121.5°E – Tropical Depression Leon makes landfall on Bongabong, Oriental Mindoro.
- 06:00 UTC at 12.8°N 120.5°E – The JTWC starts tracking Leon, designating it as 13W, now over the Mindoro Strait.
- 12:00 UTC at 12.7°N 119.2°E – The JTWC upgrades 13W (Leon) to a tropical storm as it moves away from the Philippines.
- 18:00 UTC
  - At 13.0°N 118.5°E – The JMA also upgrades 13W (Leon) to a tropical storm, naming it Noul.
  - At 12.8°N 118.2°E – The JTWC reports Noul (Leon) has attained an initial peak with 1-minute winds of 40 knots (74 km/h; 46 mph) and a central pressure of 998 hPa (998.0 mbar; 29.47 inHg).
  - (02:00 PHT, September 16) at 12.9°N 118.5°E – The PAGASA also reports Noul (Leon) has intensified to a tropical storm.

September 16

- 00:00 UTC at 40.4°N 178.9°W – The extratropical remnants of Ex-12W has crossed the IDL, per the JMA.
- 06:00 UTC (14:00 PHT) at 13.4°N 116.8°E – The PAGASA reports Noul (Leon) has attained its within-PAR maximum 10-minute winds of 40 knots (74 km/h; 46 mph).
- 12:00 UTC (20:00 PHT) at 13.7°N 116.0°E – The PAGASA determines Noul (Leon) has also achieved its within-PAR lowest central pressure of 994 hPa (994.0 mbar; 29.35 inHg).
- 18:00 UTC at 14.3°N 115.2°E – The JTWC reports Noul (Leon) has attained higher 1-minute winds of 45 knots (83 km/h; 52 mph) as it turns to the northwest over the South China Sea.
- 20:00 UTC (04:00 PHT, September 17) – Tropical Storm Noul (Leon) exits the PAR.

September 17

- 00:00 UTC at 14.7°N 114.3°E – The JTWC also reports Noul has attained a lower central pressure of 992 hPa (992.0 mbar; 29.29 inHg).
- 06:00 UTC at 15.5°N 113.1°E – The JMA reports Noul has attained its peak with 10-minute winds of 45 knots (83 km/h; 52 mph) and a central pressure of 992 hPa (992.0 mbar; 29.29 inHg) as it steers to a more westerly heading.
- 18:00 UTC at 16.3°N 110.3°E – The JTWC assesses that Noul has also peaked with 1-minute winds of 50 knots (93 km/h; 58 mph) and a central pressure of 990 hPa (990.0 mbar; 29.23 inHg) as it nears Vietnam.

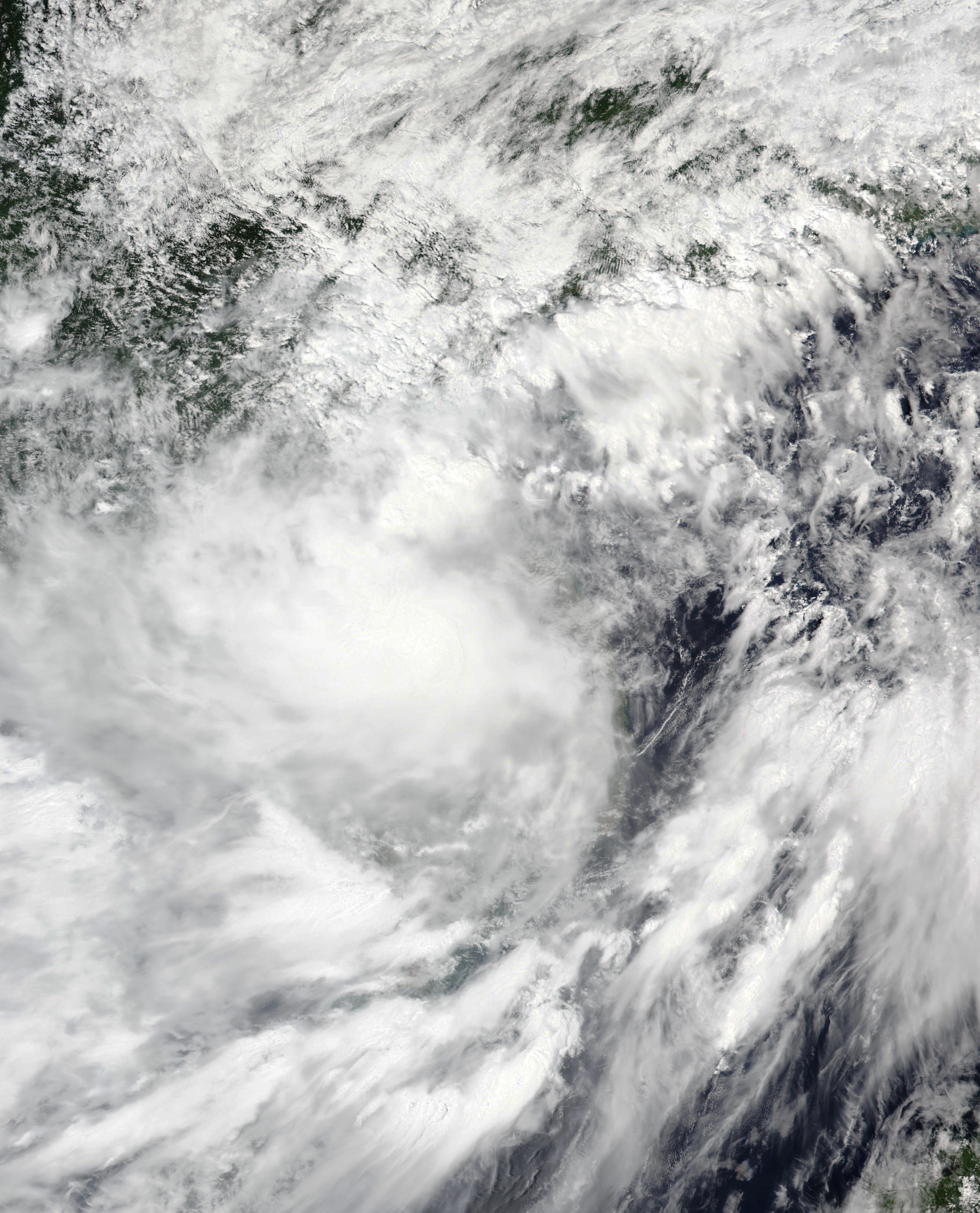
Noul after making landfall on Vietnam on September 18.

September 18

- 00:30 UTC (07:30 ICT) at 16.5°N 107.6°E – Tropical Storm Noul makes another landfall at Thừa Thiên Huế province.
- 12:00 UTC at 16.1°N 103.6°E – After quickly crossing Laos, the JTWC downgrades Noul to a tropical depression over Thailand.
- 18:00 UTC
  - At 16.2°N 102.1°E – The JMA also downgrades Noul to a tropical depression and subsequently dissipates six hours later over Thailand.
  - At 16.1°N 102.2°E – The JTWC stops tracking Noul as it weakens to a tropical disturbance.

September 19

- 12:00 UTC
  - At 21.6°N 135.0°E – The JMA marks the formation of a tropical depression over the Philippine Sea, northwest of Okinotori Island.
  - (20:00 PHT) at 21.7°N 135.0°E – The PAGASA names the tropical depression over the Philippine Sea as Marce.

September 20

- 12:00 UTC at 24.1°N 134.0°E – The JTWC starts tracking on Marce, designating it 14W, as the system turns to the northeast.
- 18:00 UTC
  - At 24.5°N 134.3°E – The JTWC reports 14W (Marce) has intensified to a tropical storm.
  - (02:00 PHT, September 21) at 24.3°N 134.3°E – The PAGASA also reports 14W (Marce) has intensified to a tropical storm.

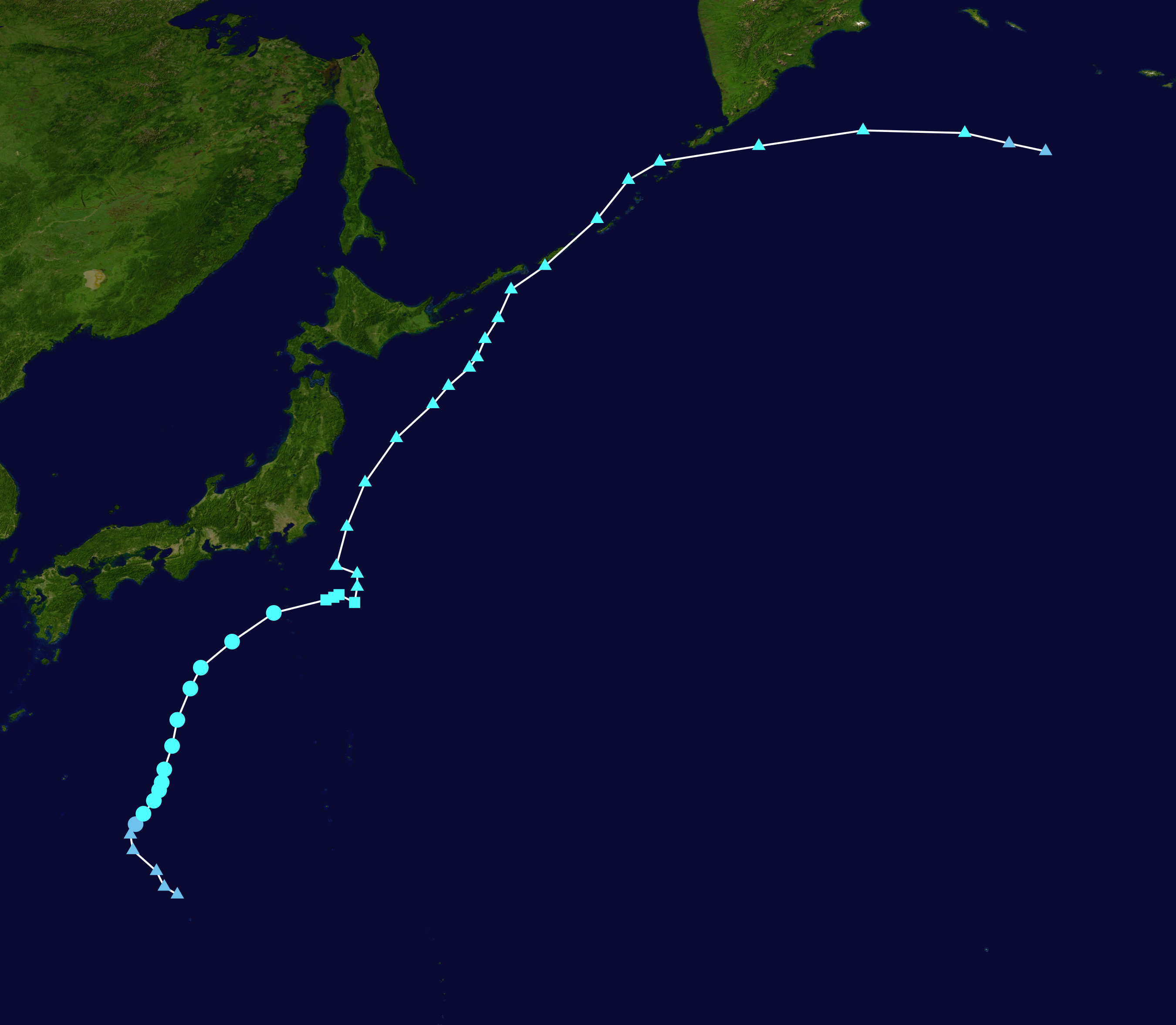
Track of Dolphin during mid-late September.

September 21

- 00:00 UTC
  - At 24.9°N 134.8°E – The JMA gives 14W (Marce) the name, Dolphin, as the system has intensified to a tropical storm.
  - At 25.0°N 134.7°E – The JTWC assesses Dolphin (Marce) has slightly deepened to a central pressure of 993 hPa (993.0 mbar; 29.32 inHg) as it slowly moves north-northeastward.
  - (08:00 PHT) at 24.9°N 134.7°E – The PAGASA reports Dolphin (Marce) has attained its within-PAR peak with 10-minute winds of 40 knots (74 km/h; 46 mph) and a central pressure of 996 hPa (996.0 mbar; 29.41 inHg).
- 03:00 UTC (11:00 PHT) – Tropical Storm Dolphin (Marce) exits the PAR.
- 18:00 UTC at 26.2°N 135.1°E – The JTWC determines Dolphin has slightly deepened to a central pressure of 988 hPa (988.0 mbar; 29.18 inHg) as it accelerates to the north-northeast.

September 22

- 00:00 UTC at 26.9°N 135.3°E – The JMA upgrades Dolphin further to a severe tropical storm.
- 06:00 UTC
  - At 28.1°N 135.8°E – The JMA reports Dolphin has attained its peak with 10-minute winds of 60 knots (110 km/h; 69 mph) and a central pressure of 975 hPa (975.0 mbar; 28.79 inHg).
  - At 28.1°N 135.6°E – The JTWC assesses that Dolphin has attained its highest 1-minute winds of 55 knots (102 km/h; 63 mph).
- 12:00 UTC at 29.3°N 136.1°E – The JTWC also determines Dolphin has achieved its minimum central pressure of 983 hPa (983.0 mbar; 29.03 inHg) as it nears Japan.

September 23

- 06:00 UTC at 32.2°N 139.3°E – The JTWC reports Dolphin has re-intensified, attaining 1-minute winds of 50 knots (93 km/h; 58 mph) and a central pressure of 986 hPa (986.0 mbar; 29.12 inHg).
- Between 06:00-09:00 UTC (15:00-18:00 JST) at 32.5°N 139.8°E – Dolphin crosses over Aogashima.
- 12:00 UTC at 32.7°N 141.3°E – The JTWC analyzes that Dolphin has transitioned to a subtropical storm and simultaneously re-attained its peak with 1-minute winds of 55 knots (102 km/h; 63 mph) and a central pressure of 983 hPa (983.0 mbar; 29.03 inHg).

September 24

- 00:00 UTC at 32.9°N 141.8°E – The JMA reports Dolphin has weakened to a tropical storm.
- 06:00 UTC
  - At 32.7°N 142.4°E – The JMA determines Dolphin has turned extratropical southeast of Japan.
  - At 32.6°N 142.4°E – The JTWC stops tracking on Subtropical Storm Dolphin.

September 25

- 12:00 UTC at 16.6°N 158.7°E – The JMA reports a tropical depression has formed well southwest of Wake Island .
- 18:00 UTC at 17.2°N 158.6°E – The JMA assesses that the tropical depression well southwest of Wake Island has deepened to a central pressure of 1,006 hPa (1,006 mbar; 29.71 inHg).

September 26

- 18:00 UTC
  - At 20.0°N 159.3°E – The JMA upgrades the tropical depression now west-northwest of Wake Island to a tropical storm, naming it Kujira.
  - At 20.0°N 159.1°E – The JTWC starts tracking on Kujira as a tropical depression as it moves to the northwest.

September 27

- 00:00 UTC – The JMA marks another tropical depression near the Northern Mariana Islands.
- 06:00 UTC – The JMA assesses the tropical depression near the Northern Mariana Islands has deepened to a central pressure of 1,006 hPa (1,006 mbar; 29.71 inHg).
- 12:00 UTC at 23.4°N 156.5°E – The JTWC upgrades Kujira to a tropical storm as it approaches Minamitorishima.
- 18:00 UTC at 25.0°N 155.3°E – The JTWC assesses Kujira has deepened to a central pressure of 998 hPa (998.0 mbar; 29.47 inHg) as it passes to the east of Minamitorishima.

September 28

- 06:00 UTC
  - At 27.7°N 153.1°E – The JMA upgrades Kujira further to a severe tropical storm as it starts to recurve.
  - At 21.9°N 146.9°E – The JMA analyzes the tropical depression near the Northern Mariana Islands has deepened further to a central pressure of 1,002 hPa (1,002 mbar; 29.59 inHg) as it slowly moves to the northeast.
- 18:00 UTC at 22.5°N 147.6°E – The JMA reports the tropical depression now northeast of the Mariana Islands has attained its lowest central pressure of 1,000 hPa (1,000 mbar; 29.53 inHg).

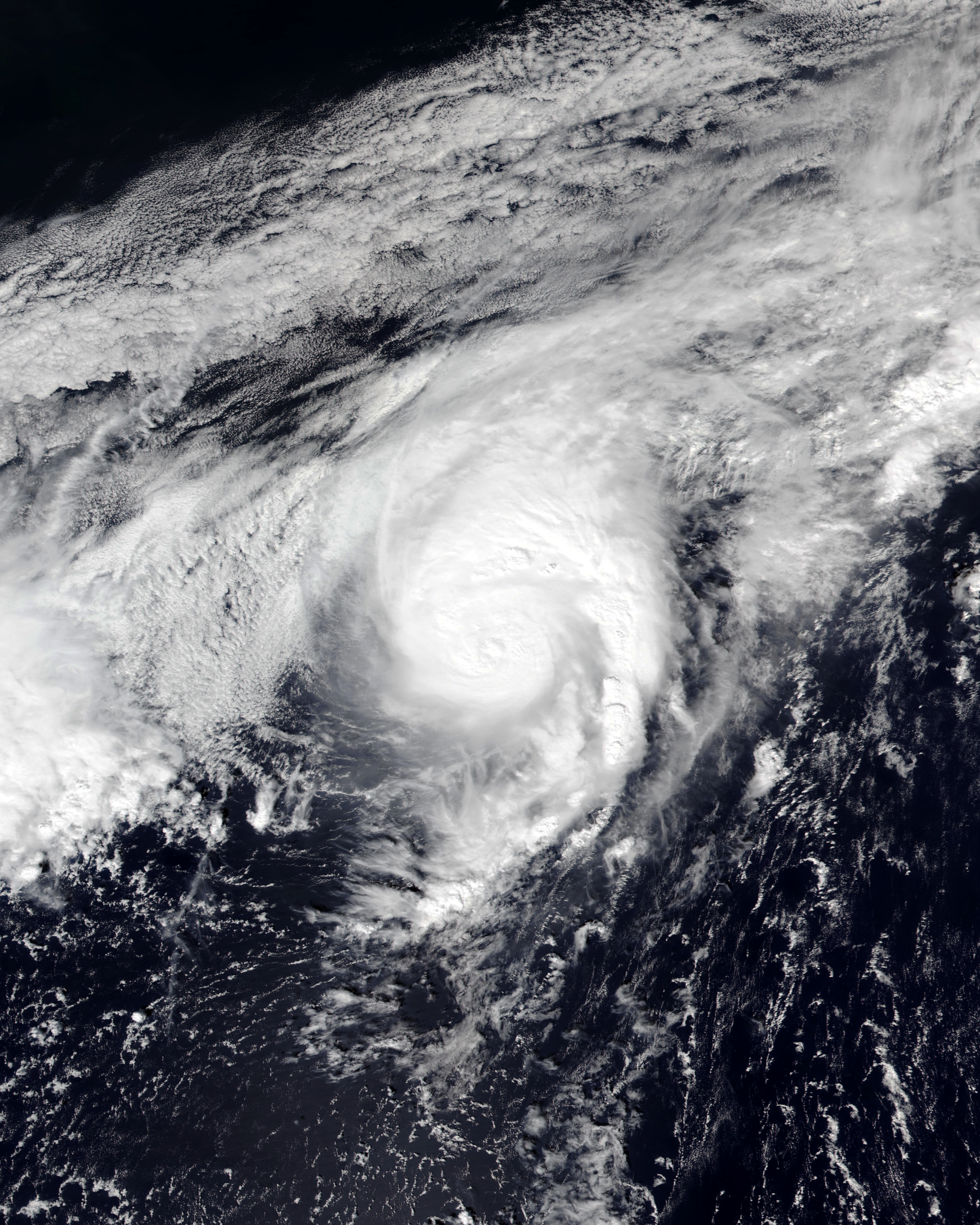
Kujira at its peak intensity well east of Japan on September 29.

September 29

- 00:00 UTC at 32.6°N 153.8°E – The JMA reports Kujira has peaked with 10-minute winds of 60 knots (110 km/h; 69 mph) and a central pressure of 980 hPa (980.0 mbar; 28.94 inHg) as it accelerates to the northeast.
- 06:00 UTC at 34.8°N 155.1°E – The JTWC upgrades Kujira further to a Category 1 typhoon, simultaneously peaking with 1-minute winds of 65 knots (120 km/h; 75 mph) and a central pressure of 974 hPa (974.0 mbar; 28.76 inHg).
- 18:00 UTC
  - At 38.1°N 158.1°E – The JTWC downgrades Kujira to a tropical storm.
  - At 27.4°N 148.3°E – The JMA last notes the tropical depression northeast of the Mariana Islands, but not before re-attaining its minimum central pressure of 1,000 hPa (1,000 mbar; 29.53 inHg); the system becomes embedded in a front six hours later.
  - At 49.9°N 168.9°E – The JMA last notes the extratropical remnants of Dolphin as it subsequently dissipates over the northern Pacific Ocean early the next day.

September 30

- 06:00 UTC
  - At 41.0°N 163.0°E – The JMA reports Kujira has turned extratropical well east of Japan.
  - At 40.6°N 163.1°E – The JTWC also determines has transitioned to an extratropical cyclone.

=== October ===
October 1

- 18:00 UTC at 37.1°N 179.6°W – The JMA last notes the extratropical remnants of Kujira after crossing the 180th meridian.

October 4

- 00:00 UTC at 21.4°N 140.0°E – The JMA marks a tropical depression east-northeast of Okinotori Island.
- 06:00 UTC at 21.8°N 140.0°E – The JMA assesses the tropical depression east-northeast of Okinotori Island has slightly deepened to a central pressure of 1,000 hPa (1,000 mbar; 29.53 inHg).
- 18:00 UTC at 22.1°N 139.3°E – The JTWC starts tracking the tropical depression now northeast of Okinotori Island, giving it the designation 16W.

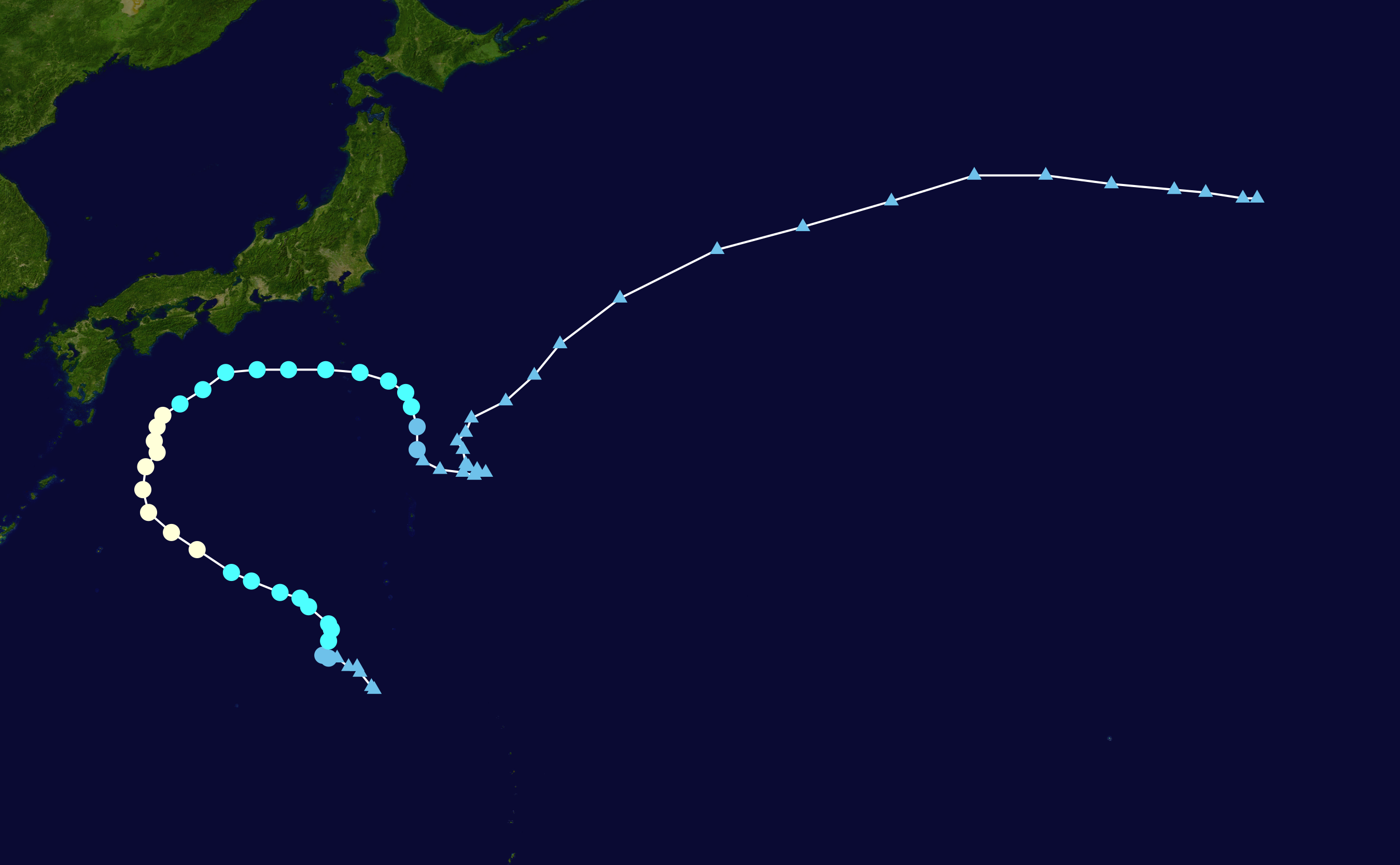
Track of Chan-hom during early-mid October.

October 5

- 00:00 UTC at 22.2°N 139.2°E – The JMA deems 16W has intensified to a tropical storm with the name Chan-hom.
- 06:00 UTC at 22.7°N 139.3°E – The JTWC also upgrades Chan-hom to a tropical storm as it slowly moves to the north-northeast.

October 6

- 12:00 UTC at 24.3°N 137.6°E – The JMA upgrades Chan-hom further to a severe tropical storm as it moves to the west-northwest.
- 18:00 UTC at 13.8°N 125.9°E – A tropical depression forms near the Philippines, east of Bicol Region, with a central pressure of 1,004 hPa (1,004 mbar; 29.65 inHg).

October 7

- 06:00 UTC
  - At 13.8°N 124.8°E – The JMA analyzes the tropical depression east of Bicol Region re-attains a central pressure of 1,004 hPa (1,004 mbar; 29.65 inHg) as it nears Catanduanes Island.
  - At 25.7°N 134.7°E – The JMA reports Chan-hom has strengthened further to a typhoon located east of the northern Daitō Islands.
  - At 25.9°N 134.7°E – The JTWC also analyzes Chan-hom has intensified to a Category 1 typhoon.
- Between 06:00-12:00 UTC (14:00-20:00 PHT) at 13.8°N 124.3°E – The tropical depression near Catanduanes hits the island.
- 18:00 UTC at 27.2°N 133.0°E – The JTWC reports Chan-hom has peaked with 1-minute winds of 80 knots (150 km/h; 92 mph) and a central pressure of 963 hPa (963.0 mbar; 28.44 inHg) as it turns to the north.
- Between 18:00-00:00 UTC (02:00-08:00 PHT, October 8) – After crossing Maqueda Channel, the tropical depression makes another landfall between the provinces of Camarines Sur and Albay before proceeding to cross the Ragay Gulf and hit the Bondoc Peninsula of Quezon Province.

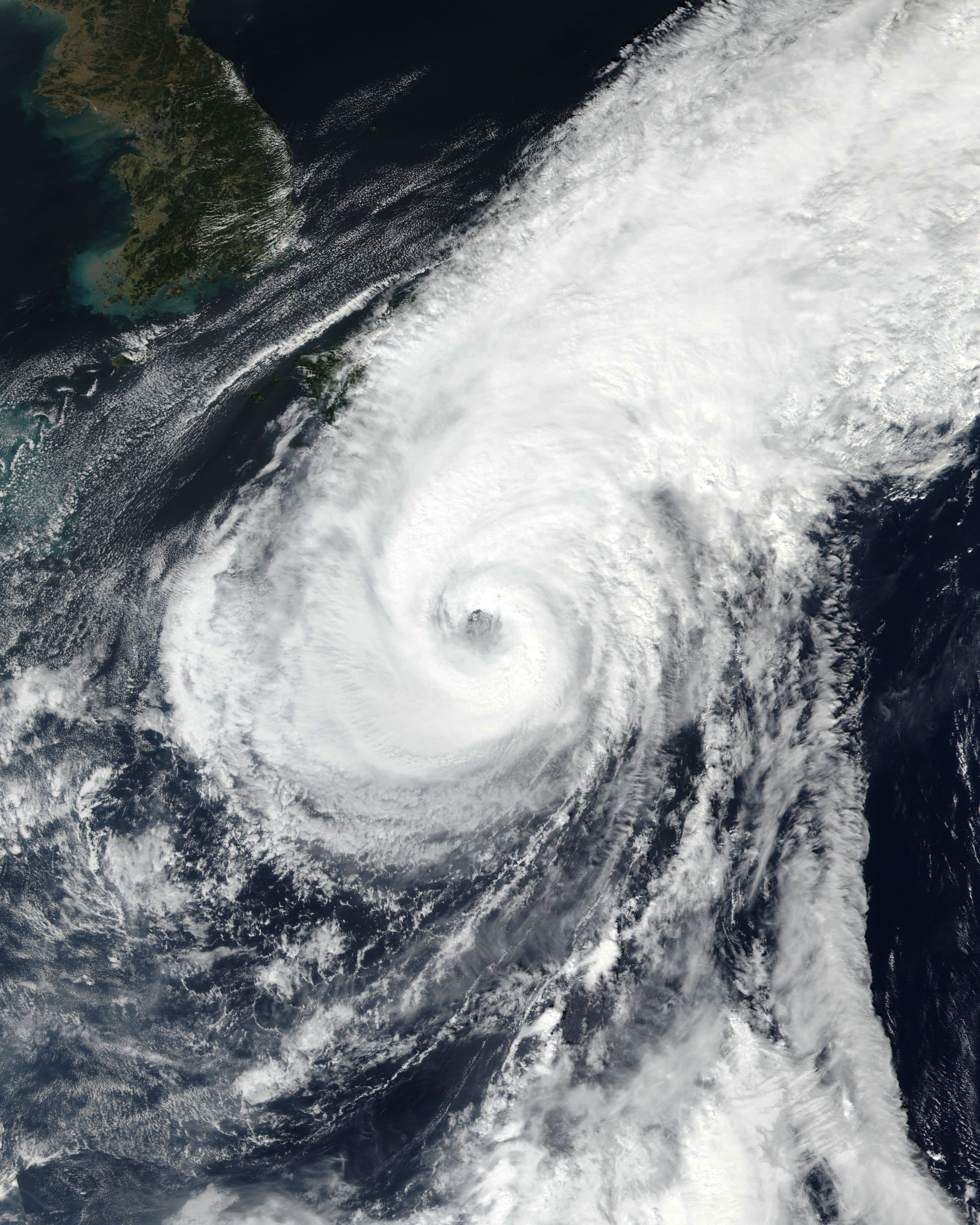
Chan-hom near its peak while nearing Japan on October 8.

October 8

- Between 00:00-06:00 UTC (08:00-14:00 PHT) at 12.9°N 121.1°E – The tropical depression hits Mindoro Island after crossing the Sibuyan Sea.
- 06:00 UTC at 12.9°N 121.2°E – The JMA analyzes the tropical depression over Mindoro deepens slightly to a central pressure of 1,006 hPa (1,006 mbar; 29.71 inHg).
- 12:00 UTC
  - At 29.4°N 133.3°E – The JMA analyzes Chan-hom has attained its peak with 10-minute winds of 70 knots (130 km/h; 81 mph) and a central pressure of 965 hPa (965.0 mbar; 28.50 inHg) as it recurves while nearing Japan.
  - At 29.3°N 133.3°E – The JTWC assesses Chan-hom has re-strengthened, re-attaining peak 1-minute winds of 80 knots (150 km/h; 92 mph) but with a slightly higher central pressure of 965 hPa (965.0 mbar; 28.50 inHg).

October 9

- 06:00 UTC at 13.2°N 115.7°E – The JMA reports the tropical depression has attained a lower central pressure of 1,004 hPa (1,004 mbar; 29.65 inHg) as it now traverses the South China Sea.
- 12:00 UTC
  - At 31.0°N 134.0°E – The JMA downgrades Chan-hom to a severe tropical storm south of Shikoku.
  - At 31.0°N 134.1°E – The JTWC follows suit, downgrading Chan-hom to a tropical storm as it parallels Japan.
- 18:00 UTC at 13.5°N 115.1°E – The JTWC begins tracking the tropical depression over the South China Sea, designating it 17W.

October 10

- 12:00 UTC at 14.7°N 112.0°E – The JTWC upgrades 17W to a tropical storm as it nears Vietnam.
- 18:00 UTC
  - At 14.6°N 110.2°E – The JMA reports 17W has strengthened to a tropical storm, gaining the name Linfa.
  - At 14.8°N 110.6°E – The JTWC assesses Linfa has peaked with 1-minute winds of 40 knots (74 km/h; 46 mph) and a central pressure of 999 hPa (999.0 mbar; 29.50 inHg).

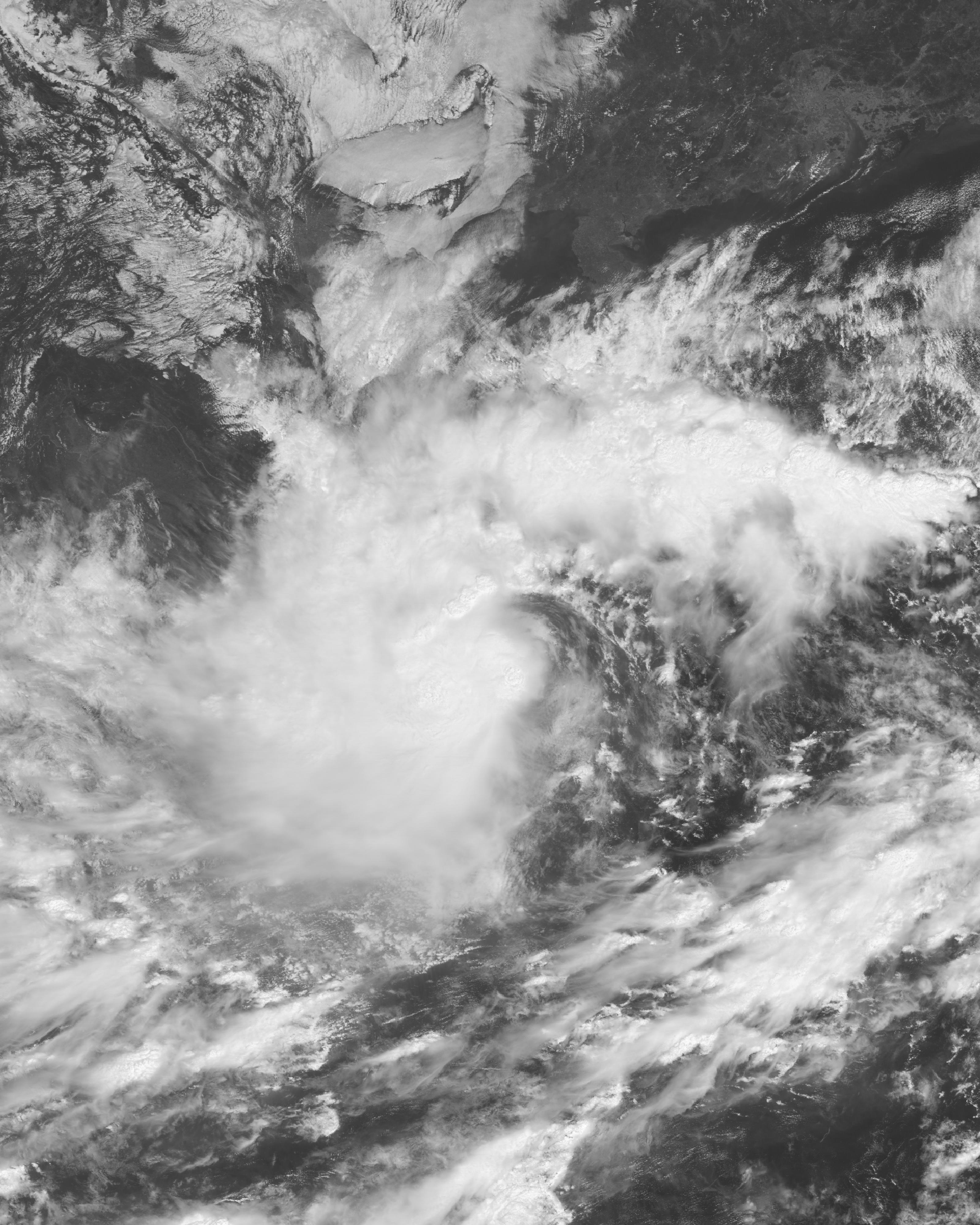
Linfa making landfall at its peak intensity on October 11.

October 11

- 00:00 UTC
  - At 14.9°N 109.4°E – The JMA analyzes Linfa has attained its peak with 10-minute winds of 45 knots (83 km/h; 52 mph) and a central pressure of 994 hPa (994.0 mbar; 29.35 inHg) as it is about to hit Vietnam.
  - At 16.7°N 119.9°E – The JMA marks a tropical depression off the western coast of Luzon.
  - At 32.1°N 140.6°E – After moving close to Aogashima, the JMA downgrades Chan-hom further to a tropical storm.
- 03:00 UTC (10:00 ICT) at 15.0°N 108.7°E – Tropical Storm Linfa makes its final hit at Quảng Ngãi province, excacerbating destructive floods in Vietnam and nearby areas.
- 06:00 UTC (14:00 PHT) at 17.0°N 119.3°E – The PAGASA starts tracking the tropical depression west of Luzon, naming it Nika.
- 12:00 UTC
  - At 14.9°N 107.9°E – The JMA determines Linfa has weakened to a tropical depression as it moves further inland.
  - At 15.3°N 107.7°E – The JTWC also downgrades Linfa to a tropical depression and subsequently stops tracking it.
  - (20:00 PHT) at 17.2°N 118.7°E – The PAGASA assesses Nika with 10-minute winds of 30 knots (56 km/h; 35 mph) and a central pressure of 1,000 hPa (1,000 mbar; 29.53 inHg) as it continues to move west-northwestward.
- 18:00 UTC
  - At 30.8°N 142.2°E – The JMA reports Chan-hom has deteriorated further to a tropical depression after turning southwestward.
  - At 30.9°N 142.2°E – The JTWC analyzes Chan-hom has deepened to a central pressure of 991 hPa (991.0 mbar; 29.26 inHg).
  - At 17.5°N 118.2°E – The JTWC starts tracking Nika as a tropical depression with the identifier 18W, with a central pressure of 1,000 hPa (1,000 mbar; 29.53 inHg).

October 12

- 00:00 UTC at 30.2°N 142.4°E – The JTWC reports Chan-hom has weakened to a tropical depression.
- 01:00 UTC (09:00 PHT) – The PAGASA reports 18W (Nika) has exited the PAR.
- 06:00 UTC
  - At 17.6°N 116.0°E – The JMA upgrades 18W to a tropical storm, naming it Nangka.
  - At 17.9°N 115.7°E – The JTWC follows suit, upgrading Nangka to a tropical storm.
  - At 14.2°N 106.7°E – The JMA assesses Linfa has briefly deepened to a central pressure of 1,002 hPa (1,002 mbar; 29.59 inHg) and last noting it as it subsequently dissipates over northern Cambodia six hours later.
  - At 29.6°N 142.5°E – The JMA assesses Chan-hom has briefly deepened to a central pressure of 1,002 hPa (1,002 mbar; 29.59 inHg).
- 12:00 UTC at 29.0°N 142.6°E – The JTWC downgrades Chan-hom further to a tropical disturbance as it turns to the east-southeast north of the Bonin Islands.

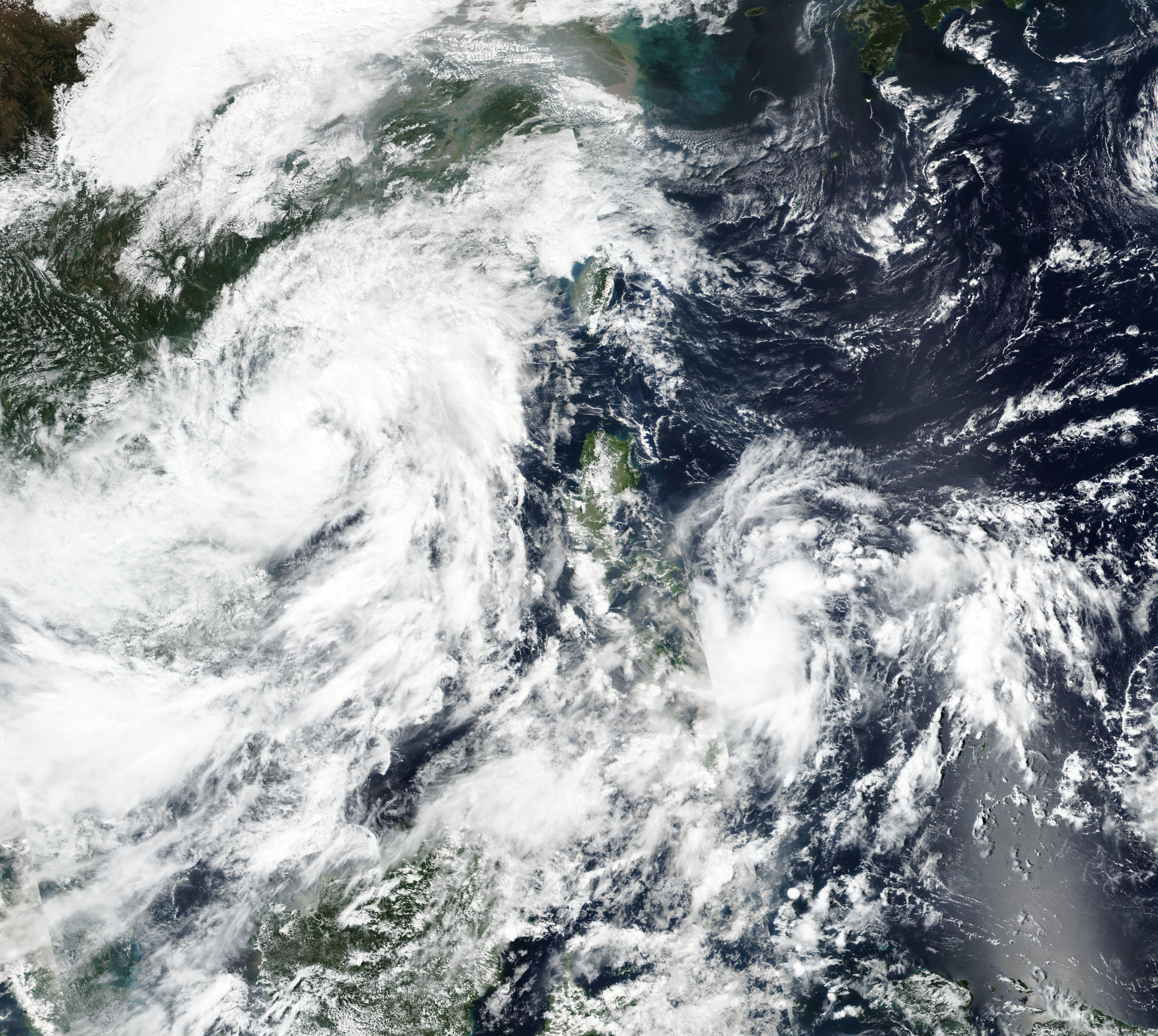
2 tropical cyclones active on October 13 with Nangka (left) impacting Hainan and Ofel (right) heading towards the Philippines.

October 13

- 00:00 UTC
  - At 18.3°N 112.0°E – The JMA reports Nangka has attained its peak 10-minute winds of 45 knots (83 km/h; 52 mph) as it nears Hainan.
  - At 11.0°N 127.9°E – The JMA starts tracking another tropical depression east-southeast of Samar.
  - (08:00 PHT) at 10.9°N 127.8°E – The PAGASA starts tracking the tropical depression east-southeast of Samar, naming it Ofel, with maximum 10-minute winds of 25 knots (46 km/h; 29 mph) as it nears the island.
- 06:00 UTC
  - At 11.2°N 127.6°E – The JMA assesses Ofel has slightly deepened to a central pressure of 1,006 hPa (1,006 mbar; 29.71 inHg).
  - At 28.6°N 144.6°E – The JMA analyzes Chan-hom has briefly deepened to a central pressure of 1,006 hPa (1,006 mbar; 29.71 inHg) as it slows down.
- 11:20 UTC (19:20 CST) at 19.2°N 110.5°E – Tropical Storm Nangka makes landfall on Qionghai City, Hainan.
- 12:00 UTC
  - At 19.0°N 110.4°E – The JMA analyzes Nangka has attained its lowest central pressure of 990 hPa (990.0 mbar; 29.23 inHg) upon making landfall.
  - At 19.0°N 110.5°E – The JTWC assesses Nangka has peaked with 1-minute winds of 50 knots (93 km/h; 58 mph) and a central pressure of 989 hPa (989.0 mbar; 29.21 inHg).
- 18:10 UTC (02:10 PHT, October 14) at 12.1°N 125.6°E – Tropical Depression Ofel makes its first landfall at Hilabaan Island of Dolores, Eastern Samar.
- 18:30 UTC (02:30 PHT, October 14) at 12.0°N 125.5°E – Tropical Depression Ofel makes its second hit at Dolores, Eastern Samar, within the island of Samar.
- 23:00 UTC (07:00 PHT, October 14) at 12.7°N 124.4°E – After traversing Samar, Ofel makes another landfall at the island municipality of Biri, Northern Samar.

October 14

- 02:40 UTC (10:40 PHT) at 12.8°N 124.1°E – Ofel makes another hit at Bulusan, Sorsogon after crossing the San Bernardino Strait.
- 06:00 UTC at 12.9°N 123.4°E – After emerging over Burias Pass, the JMA assesses Ofel has deepened to a lower central pressure of 1,004 hPa (1,004 mbar; 29.65 inHg).
- 07:30 UTC (15:30 PHT) at 13.1°N 123.0°E – Tropical Depression Ofel makes another landfall on San Pascual (Burias Island), Masbate.
- 09:00 UTC (16:00 ICT) at 20.3°N 106.3°E – After briefly traversing the Gulf of Tonkin, Tropical Storm Nangka makes its final hit at Nam Định province.
- 09:40 UTC (17:40 PHT) at 13.4°N 122.5°E – Ofel makes another direct hit at San Francisco, Quezon on the Bondoc Peninsula.
- 11:20 UTC (19:20 PHT) at 13.3°N 122.1°E – Tropical Depression Ofel makes its seventh landfall on Torrijos, Marinduque Island after crossing Mompong Pass.
- 12:00 UTC
  - At 19.9°N 105.9°E – The JMA downgrades Nangka to a tropical depression and stops tracking it as the system subsequently dissipates six hours later.
  - At 20.0°N 105.4°E – The JTWC reports Nangka has rapidly degraded to a tropical disturbance upon making landfall.
- 14:10 UTC (22:10 PHT) at 13.6°N 121.2°E – Tropical Depression Ofel makes its eighth and final hit at Lobo, Batangas.

October 15

- 06:00 UTC (14:00 PHT) at 14.8°N 117.8°E – Now traversing the South China Sea, the PAGASA reports Ofel has attained its lowest central pressure of 1,002 hPa (1,002 mbar; 29.59 inHg).
- 13:00 UTC (21:00 PHT) – Tropical Depression Ofel leaves the PAR, as reported by PAGASA.

October 16

- 06:00 UTC
  - At 16.4°N 109.7°E – The JMA stops tracking Ex-Ofel near Vietnam but not before attaining its lowest central pressure of 1,002 hPa (1,002 mbar; 29.59 inHg); the system becomes unmarked six hours later.
  - At 32.0°N 146.5°E – After days of meandering to the northeast of the Bonin Islands, Chan-hom starts accelerating to the northeast as the JMA assesses its central pressure to have slightly dropped to 1,010 hPa (1,010 mbar; 29.83 inHg).

October 17

- 00:00 UTC at 36.4°N 152.9°E – The JMA reports Chan-hom has transitioned to an extratropical low well east of Japan.

October 18

- 18:00 UTC
  - At 13.1°N 130.3°E – The JMA starts tracking another tropical depression over the Philippine Sea.
  - (02:00 PHT, October 19) at 13.0°N 131.7°E – The PAGASA names the tropical depression over the Philippine Sea, Pepito.

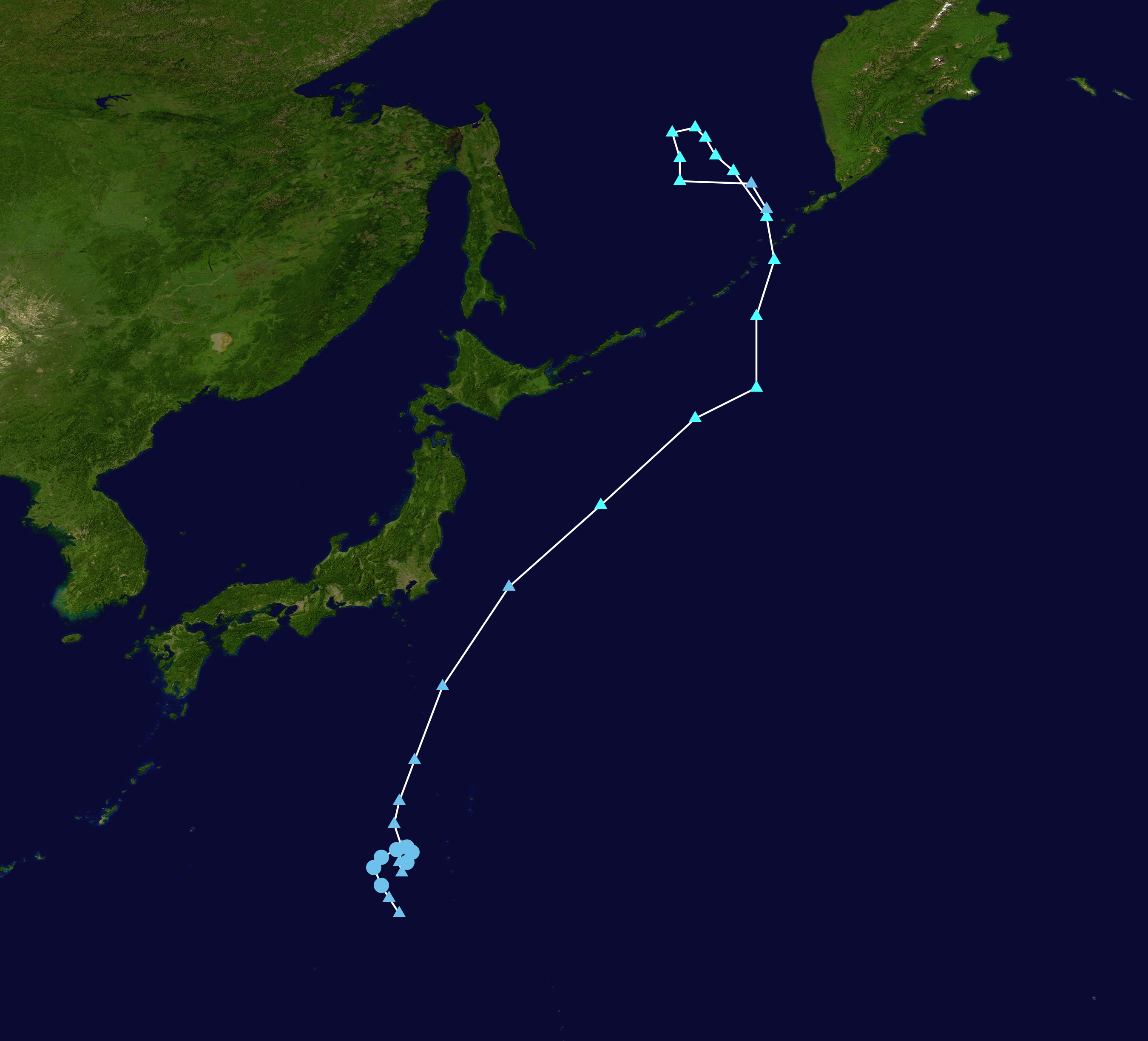
Track of 20W during mid-late October.

October 19

- 00:00 UTC at 13.7°N 129.4°E – The JTWC starts tracking Pepito, designating it 19W as it moves west-northwestward.
- 06:00 UTC at 38.2°N 171.8°E – The JMA stops tracking the extratropical remnants of Chan-hom as it subsequently dissipates six hours later while heading towards the IDL.
- 18:00 UTC at 23.7°N 138.7°E – The JMA and JTWC starts tracking a tropical depression southwest of the Volcano Islands, with the latter designating it 20W and assessing it with a central pressure of 1,005 hPa (1,005 mbar; 29.68 inHg) while the JMA analyzes the system to have a higher central pressure of 1,010 hPa (1,010 mbar; 29.83 inHg).

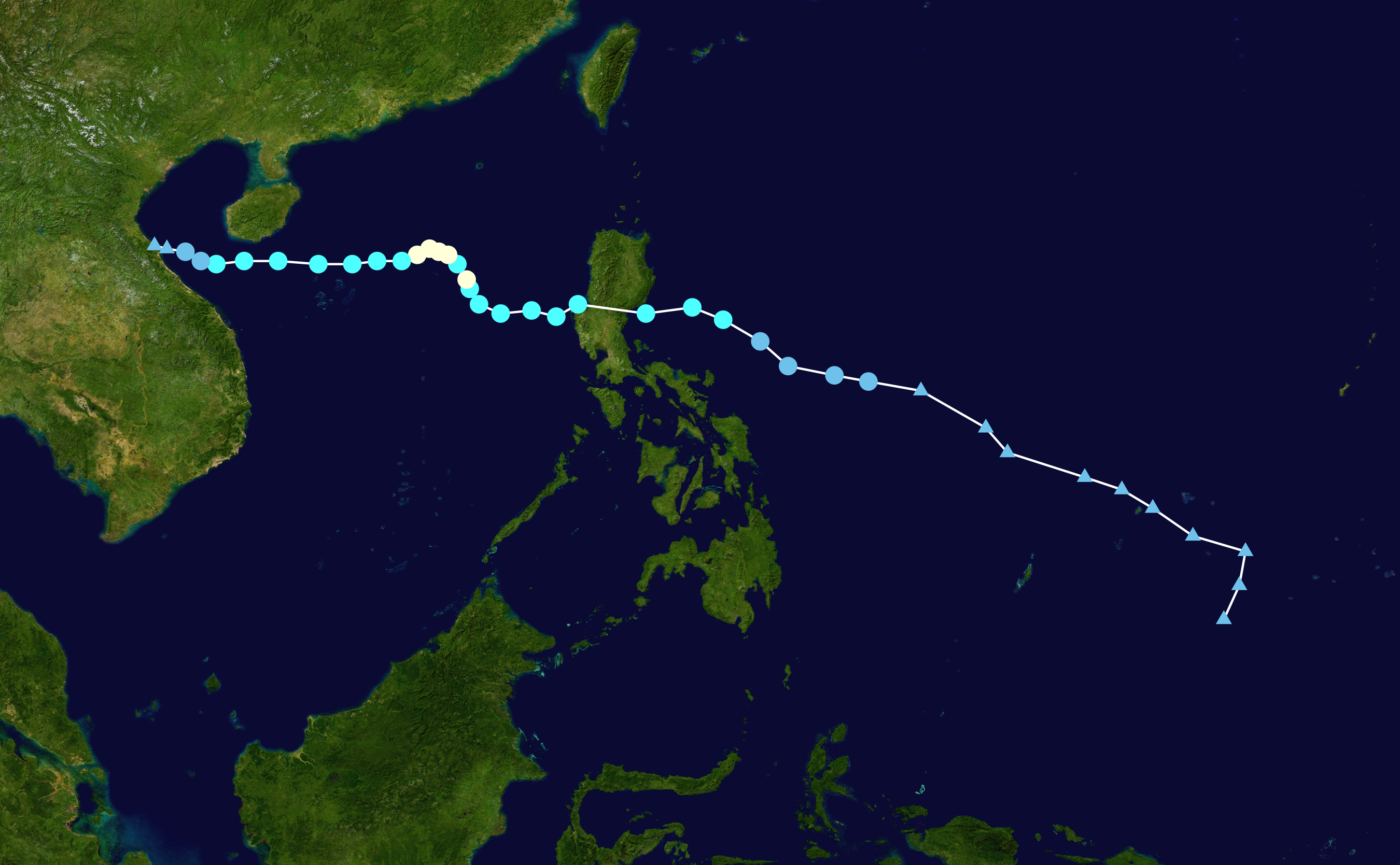
Track of Saudel during mid-late October.

October 20

- 00:00 UTC
  - At 15.5°N 124.5°E – The JMA upgrades 19W (Pepito) to a tropical storm with the name Saudel.
  - At 15.7°N 124.7°E – The JTWC also reports Saudel (Pepito) has intensified to a tropical storm as it nears Luzon.
  - (08:00 PHT) at 15.6°N 124.7°E – The PAGASA follows suit, upgrading Saudel (Pepito) to a tropical storm.
- 06:00 UTC
  - At 16.1°N 123.7°E – The JTWC analyzes Saudel (Pepito) has attained an initial peak with 1-minute winds of 45 knots (83 km/h; 52 mph) and a central pressure of 993 hPa (993.0 mbar; 29.32 inHg).
  - At 24.8°N 138.7°E – The JMA assesses 20W has deepened further to a central pressure of 1,008 hPa (1,008 mbar; 29.77 inHg) as it recurves to the east-northeast.
- 12:00 UTC at 25.1°N 139.3°E – The JTWC reports 20W has attained 1-minute winds of 30 knots (56 km/h; 35 mph) as it decelerates.
- 13:00 UTC (21:00 PHT) – Tropical Storm Saudel (Pepito) hits the southern tip of the San Ildefonso Peninsula of Casiguran, Aurora.
- 13:30 UTC (21:00 PHT) at 16.1°N 121.8°E – Saudel (Pepito) makes another landfall at Dinalungan, Aurora.
- 20:00 UTC (04:00 PHT, October 21) at 16.3°N 119.9°E – After briefly emerging over Lingayen Gulf, Tropical Storm Saudel (Pepito) makes its third hit at Anda (Cabarruyan Island), Pangasinan.

October 21

- 00:00 UTC at 25.0°N 139.9°E – The JTWC also reports 20W has attained its lowest central pressure of 1,001 hPa (1,001 mbar; 29.56 inHg) as it turns to the southwest.
- 06:00 UTC
  - At 16.0°N 118.5°E – Now over the South China Sea, the JTWC analyzes Saudel (Pepito) has attained a lower central pressure of 991 hPa (991.0 mbar; 29.26 inHg).
  - At 24.6°N 139.7°E – The JMA analyzes 20W has deepened further to a central pressure of 1,006 hPa (1,006 mbar; 29.71 inHg).
- 12:00 UTC
  - At 15.8°N 117.4°E – The JMA upgrades Saudel (Pepito) further to a severe tropical storm as it continues to move away from the Philippines.
  - (20:00 PHT) at 16.0°N 117.5°E – The PAGASA reports Saudel (Pepito) has strengthened to a severe tropical storm as it decelerates.
  - At 24.2°N 139.5°E – The JTWC determines 20W has degenerated to a tropical disturbance while turning poleward.

October 22

- 00:00 UTC
  - (08:00 PHT) at 16.7°N 116.5°E – The PAGASA assesses Saudel (Pepito) with 10-minute winds of 60 knots (110 km/h; 69 mph) and a central pressure of 980 hPa (980.0 mbar; 28.94 inHg) as it is about to exit the PAR.
  - At 9.4°N 137.5°E – The JMA begins monitoring another tropical depression near Yap.
- 02:00 UTC (10:00 PHT) – Saudel (Pepito) exits the PAR.
- 06:00 UTC
  - At 17.0°N 116.4°E – The JTWC upgrades Saudel further to a Category 1 typhoon, simultaneously attaining a second peak with 1-minute winds of 65 knots (120 km/h; 75 mph) and a central pressure of 980 hPa (980.0 mbar; 28.94 inHg).
  - At 26.1°N 139.2°E – The JMA reports Ex-20W has re-attained a central pressure of 1,006 hPa (1,006 mbar; 29.71 inHg) located to the northwest of the Volcano Islands.
  - At 9.6°N 137.1°E – The JMA analyzes the tropical depression near Yap attained a central pressure of 1,004 hPa (1,004 mbar; 29.65 inHg) as it moves west-northwestward.
- 12:00 UTC
  - At 17.1°N 115.9°E – The JMA reports Saudel has peaked with 10-minute winds of 65 knots (120 km/h; 75 mph) and a central pressure of 975 hPa (975.0 mbar; 28.79 inHg) as it continues to move slowly over the South China Sea.
  - At 17.5°N 116.1°E – The JTWC reports Saudel has briefly weakened to a tropical storm.
- 18:00 UTC
  - At 17.8°N 115.8°E – The JTWC re-upgrades to a Category 1 typhoon as it slowly turns to the west.
  - At 10.0°N 135.5°E – The JMA reports the tropical depression re-attained a central pressure of 1,004 hPa (1,004 mbar; 29.65 inHg) as it continues moving away from Yap.

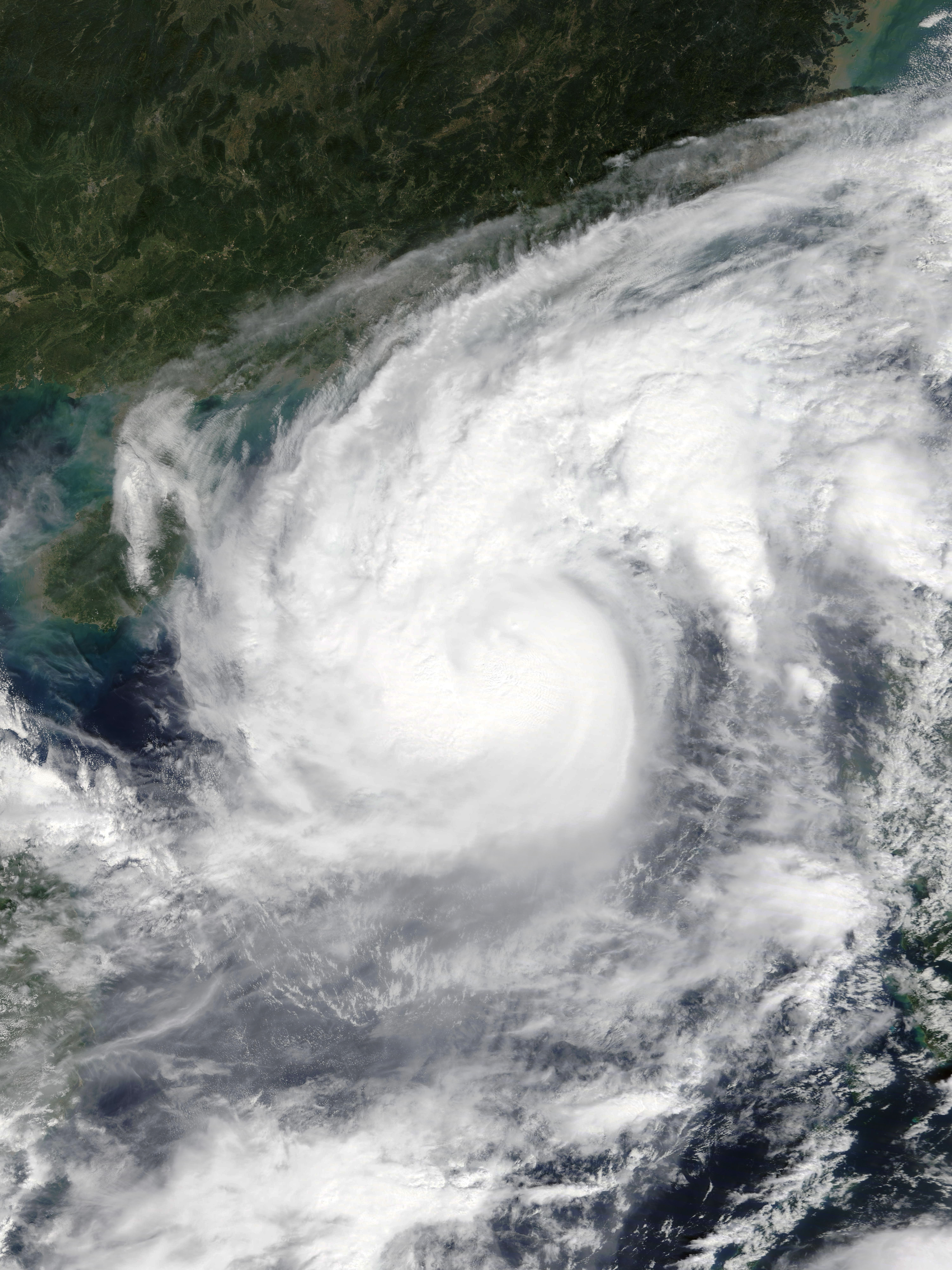
Saudel at its peak intensity over the South China Sea on October 23.

October 23

- 00:00 UTC
  - At 17.9°N 115.5°E – The JTWC analyzes Saudel has attained its best peak with 1-minute winds of 75 knots (139 km/h; 86 mph) and a central pressure of 975 hPa (975.0 mbar; 28.79 inHg).
  - (08:00 PHT) at 10.2°N 134.9°E – The PAGASA names the tropical depression west-northwest of Yap, Quinta.
- 06:00 UTC
  - At 35.4°N 143.7°E – Now accelerating northeast, Ex-20W attains its lowest central pressure of 998 hPa (998.0 mbar; 29.47 inHg) as it turns extratropical east of Japan.
  - At 10.5°N 134.2°E – The JMA assesses Quinta has deepened back to a central pressure of 1,004 hPa (1,004 mbar; 29.65 inHg) as it turns northwestward.
- 12:00 UTC
  - At 17.9°N 114.2°E – The JMA reports Saudel has weakened back to a severe tropical storm.
  - At 38.6°N 147.3°E – The JMA determines Ex-20W has turned extratropical.
- 18:00 UTC at 17.6°N 114.3°E – The JTWC downgrades Saudel to a tropical storm as it gradually accelerates westward.

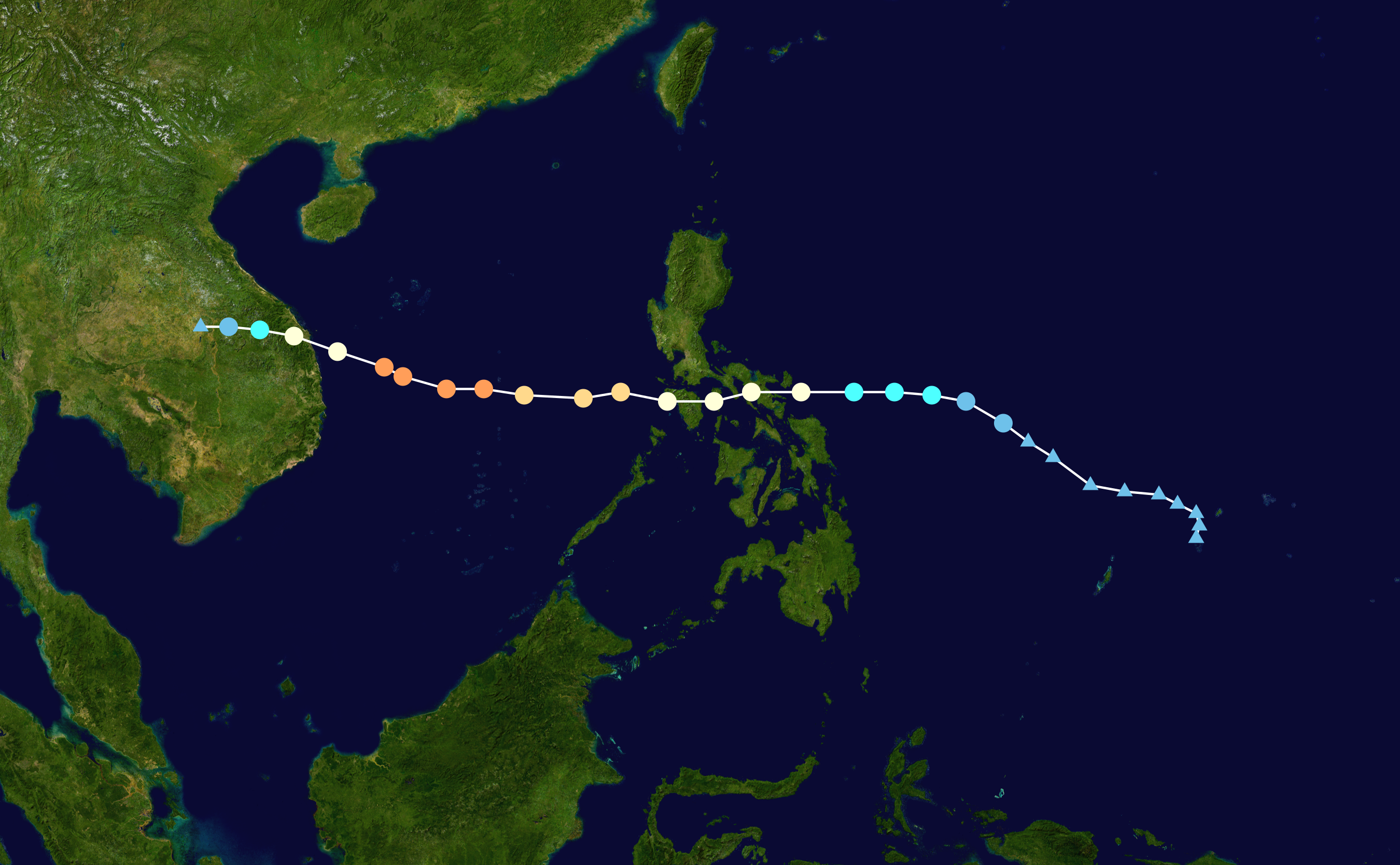
Track of Molave during late October.

October 24

- 00:00 UTC at 12.4°N 131.2°E – The JTWC starts tracking Quinta, assigning it 21W.
- 06:00 UTC
  - At 13.1°N 129.7°E – The JMA determines 21W (Quinta) has intensified to Tropical Storm Molave.
  - (14:00 PHT) at 13.1°N 130.0°E – The PAGASA also upgrades Molave (Quinta) to a tropical storm as it turns westward.
- 12:00 UTC at 13.3°N 128.9°E – The JTWC follows suit, upgrading Molave (Quinta) to a tropical storm as it nears the Bicol Region.

October 25

- 00:00 UTC
  - At 13.4°N 126.4°E – The JMA upgrades Molave (Quinta) further to a severe tropical storm.
  - (08:00 PHT) at 13.4°N 126.3°E – The PAGASA determines Molave (Quinta) has strengthened to a severe tropical storm.
  - At 17.5°N 109.0°E – Now moving south of Hainan, the JMA downgrades Saudel further to a tropical storm.
  - At 17.6°N 109.2°E – The JTWC analyzes Saudel has briefly deepened to a central pressure of 1,001 hPa (1,001 mbar; 29.56 inHg).
- 06:00 UTC
  - At 13.4°N 124.7°E – The JTWC reports Molave (Quinta) has intensified to a Category 1 typhoon as it moves near Catanduanes.
  - (14:00 PHT) at 13.4°N 124.8°E – The PAGASA upgrades Molave (Quinta) further to a typhoon as it is about to make landfall.
- 10:10 UTC (18:10 PHT) at 13.4°N 123.8°E – Molave (Quinta) hits the vicinity of San Miguel Island of Tabaco City, Albay.
- 10:50 UTC (18:50 PHT) – Molave (Quinta) makes another landfall in Albay, near the border of Tabaco City and Malinao.
- 12:00 UTC
  - At 13.3°N 123.2°E – After emerging over the Ragay Gulf, the JMA reports Molave (Quinta) has strengthened to a typhoon with 10-minute winds of 70 knots (130 km/h; 81 mph).
  - At 17.5°N 107.6°E – The JMA reports Saudel has weakened further to a tropical depression and last notes the system as it subsequently dissipates over the Gulf of Tonkin six hours later.
  - At 17.6°N 107.8°E – The JTWC downgrades Saudel further to a tropical depression while nearing Vietnam.
- 14:30 UTC (22:30 PHT) at 13.3°N 122.7°E – Molave (Quinta) hits the Bondoc Peninsula, in the vicinity of San Andres, Quezon.
- 18:00 UTC at 17.9°N 107.3°E – The JTWC analyzes Ex-Saudel has slightly deepened to a central pressure of 1,006 hPa (1,006 mbar; 29.71 inHg).
- 19:30 UTC (03:30 PHT, October 26) – Typhoon Molave (Quinta) makes its fourth hit on the border of Pola and Pinamalayan towns of Oriental Mindoro.

October 26

- 00:00 UTC at 18.0°N 106.7°E – The JTWC determines Ex-Saudel has degenerated to a tropical disturbance just before reaching the coast of Hà Tĩnh-Quảng Bình provinces.
- 06:00 UTC at 13.4°N 118.9°E – Now over the South China Sea, the JTWC upgrades Molave (Quinta) to a Category 2 typhoon.
- 12:00 UTC
  - At 13.2°N 117.7°E – The JTWC analyzes Molave (Quinta) has deepened to a central pressure of 966 hPa (966.0 mbar; 28.53 inHg) before briefly rising.
  - (20:00 PHT) at 13.4°N 117.6°E – The PAGASA assesses Molave (Quinta) has reached its within-PAR peak, with 10-minute sustained winds of 80 knots (150 km/h; 92 mph) and a central pressure of 955 hPa (955.0 mbar; 28.20 inHg).
  - At 14.1°N 141.7°E – Another tropical depression forms to the west-northwest of Guam.
- 18:00 UTC at 14.6°N 141.7°E – The JMA assesses the tropical depression west-northwest of Guam with a central pressure of 1,006 hPa (1,006 mbar; 29.71 inHg) as it moves northward.
- 23:00 UTC (07:00 PHT, October 27) – Typhoon Molave (Quinta) exits the PAR, according to PAGASA.

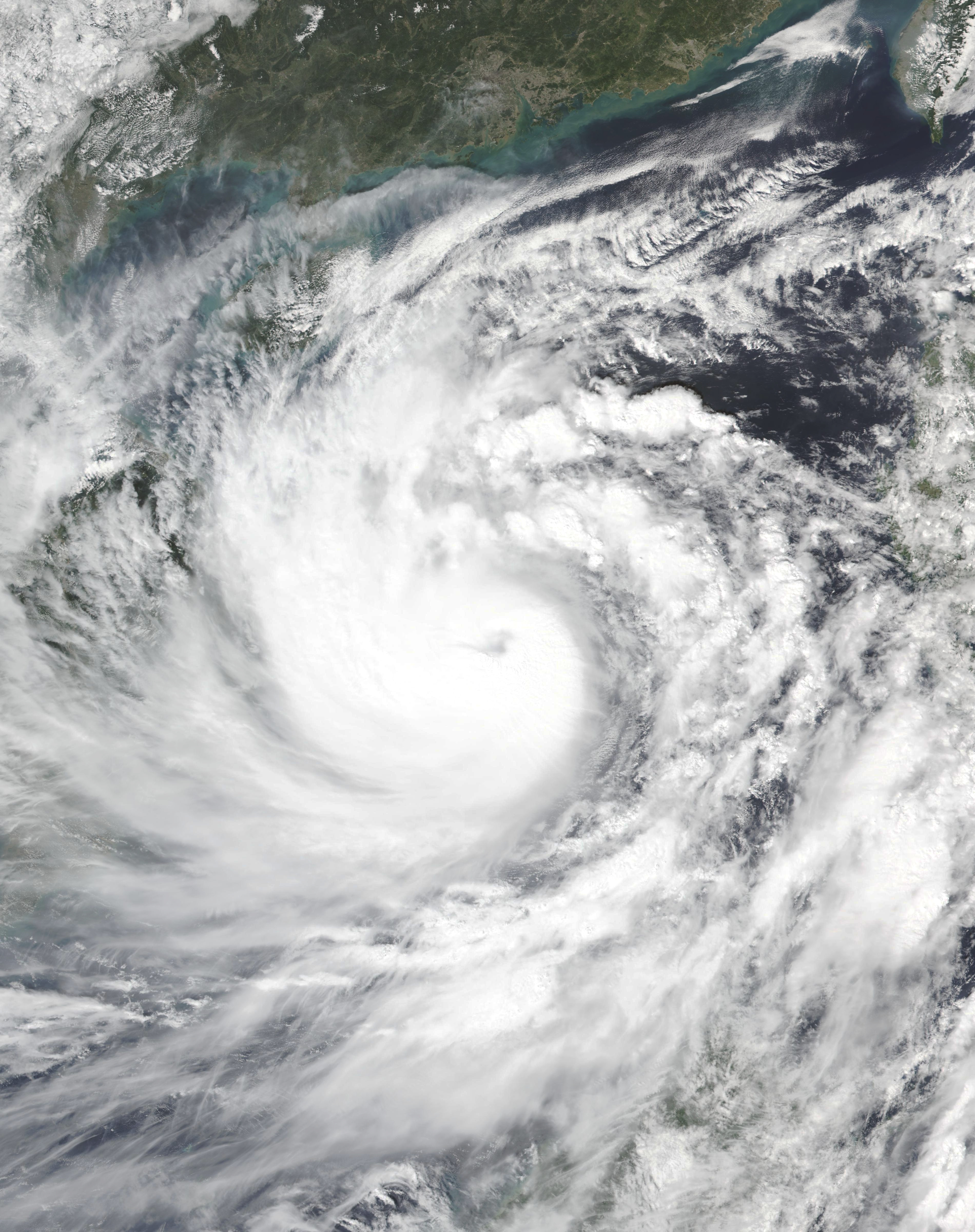
Molave near its peak intensity over the South China Sea on October 27.

October 27

- 00:00 UTC
  - At 13.5°N 114.5°E – The JTWC upgrades Molave further to a Category 3 typhoon as it continues to traverse westwards.
  - At 15.4°N 141.6°E – The JTWC assigns the identifier 22W to the tropical depression northwest of Guam.
  - At 50.2°N 153.8°E – The JMA stops tracking the extratropical remnants of Ex-20W as it subsequently dissipates six hours later over the Sea of Okhotsk near the Kuril Islands.
- 06:00 UTC
  - At 13.5°N 113.2°E – The JMA reports Molave has peaked with 10-minute winds of 90 knots (170 km/h; 100 mph) and a central pressure of 940 hPa (940.0 mbar; 27.76 inHg) as it turns west-northwestward.
  - At 13.5°N 113.3°E – The JTWC also analyzes Molave has peaked with 1-minute winds of 105 knots (194 km/h; 121 mph) and a central pressure of 952 hPa (952.0 mbar; 28.11 inHg).
  - At 15.7°N 141.5°E – The JMA assesses 22W re-attained a central pressure of 1,006 hPa (1,006 mbar; 29.71 inHg) as it turns to the west-northwest.
- 18:00 UTC
  - At 14.2°N 111.3°E – The JTWC assesses Molave has slightly deepened to a central pressure of 955 hPa (955.0 mbar; 28.20 inHg) as it nears Vietnam.
  - At 16.2°N 140.7°E – The JMA reports 22W's central pressure continues to fluctuate as it deepens back to 1,006 hPa (1,006 mbar; 29.71 inHg).
  - At 16.4°N 140.6°E – The JTWC assesses 22W has slightly deepened to a central pressure of 1,003 hPa (1,003 mbar; 29.62 inHg) before briefly rising.

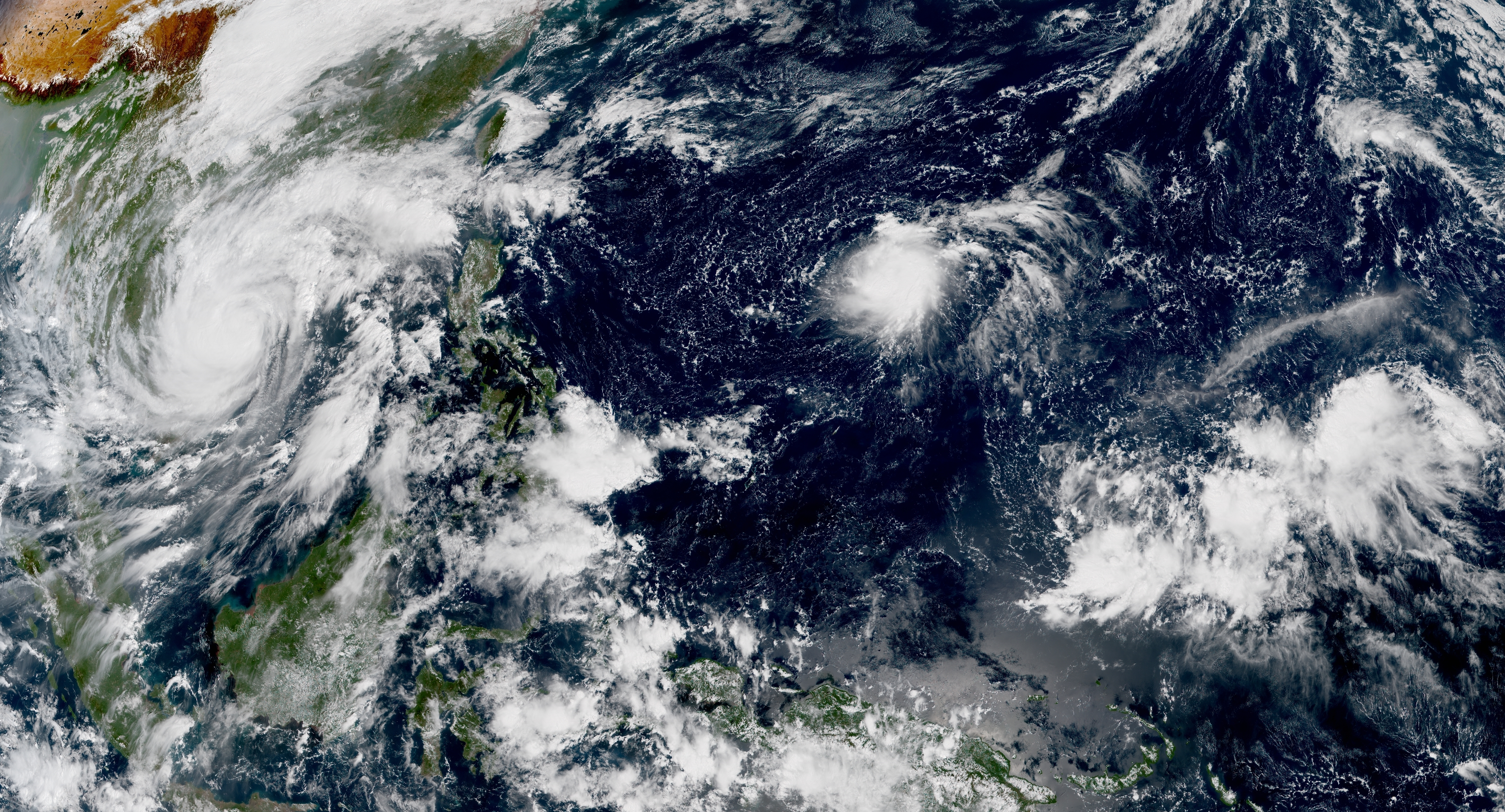
Three tropical systems present over the Western Pacific: Molave (left) heading towards Vietnam, a tropical depression over the Pacific Ocean (center-right) which would become Goni, and a low-pressure area (bottom-right) which would become Atsani.

October 28

- 00:00 UTC at 14.7°N 109.8°E – The JTWC reports Molave has rapidly weakened to a Category 1 typhoon as it is about to hit Vietnam.
- 05:00 UTC (12:00 ICT) at 15.0°N 108.7°E – Typhoon Molave makes its final landfall on Quảng Ngãi province.
- 06:00 UTC
  - At 15.2°N 108.4°E – After making landfall, the JTWC analyzes Molave has slightly deepened to a central pressure of 974 hPa (974.0 mbar; 28.76 inHg).
  - At 16.4°N 139.3°E – 22W's central pressure deepens back to 1,006 hPa (1,006 mbar; 29.71 inHg) as it traverses the Philippine Sea, per the JMA.
- 12:00 UTC
  - At 16.6°N 138.5°E – The JTWC upgrades 22W to a tropical storm with a central pressure of 1,000 hPa (1,000 mbar; 29.53 inHg) as it moves westward.
  - At 15.4°N 108.4°E – The JMA reports Molave has quickly weakened to a tropical storm.
  - At 15.4°N 107.3°E – The JTWC also downgrades Molave to a tropical storm as it moves further inland.
- 18:00 UTC
  - At 16.6°N 137.8°E – The JMA also upgrades 22W to a tropical storm, naming it Goni.
  - At 15.8°N 106.4°E – The JMA downgrades Molave further to a tropical depression now over Laos.
  - At 15.5°N 106.3°E – The JTWC follows suit, downgrading Molave to a tropical depression.

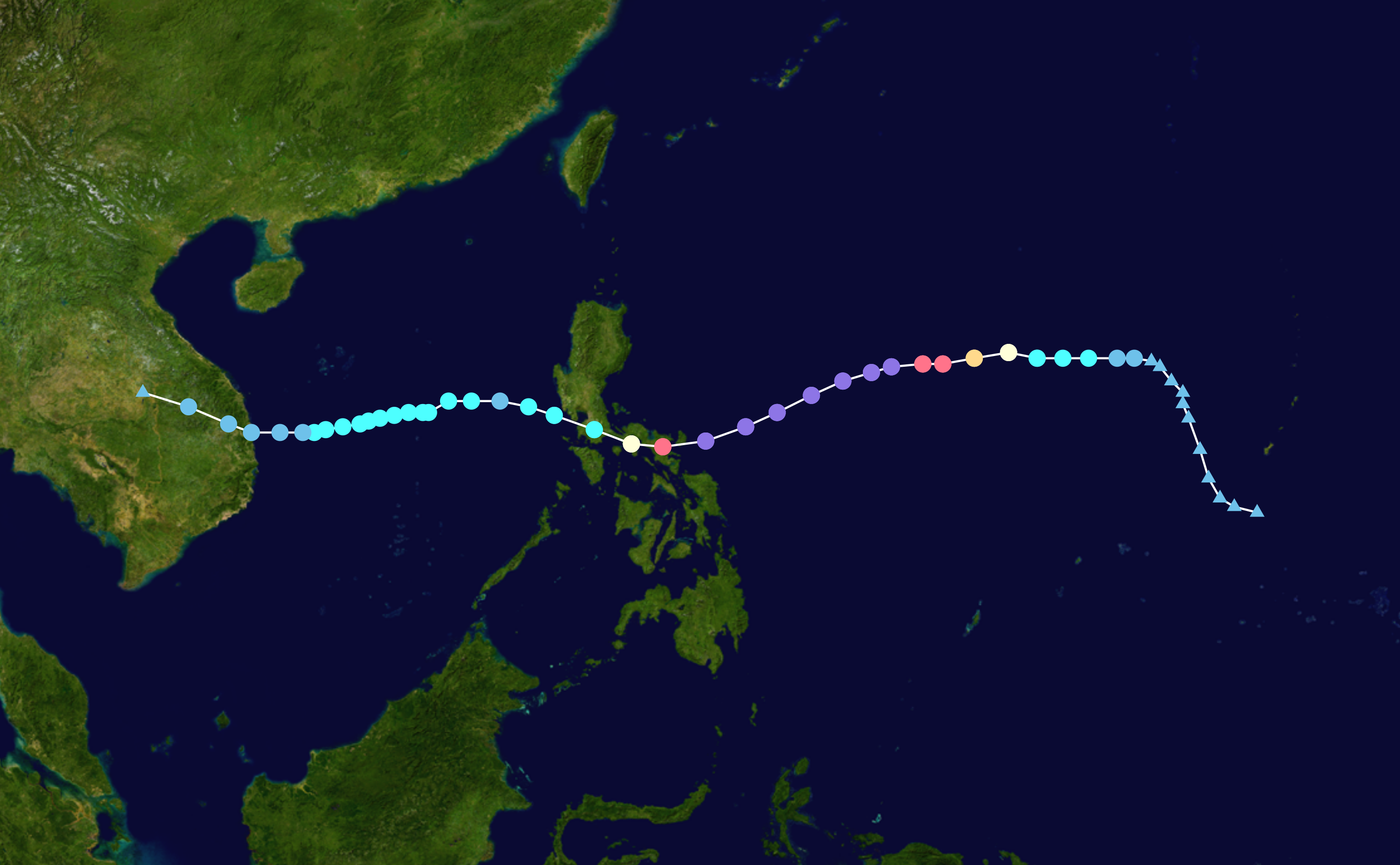
Track of Goni during late October to early November.

October 29

- 00:00 UTC
  - At 15.0°N 105.0°E – The JMA last notes Molave as it subsequently dissipates six hours later.
  - At 15.5°N 105.4°E – The JTWC reports Molave has degenerated to a tropical disturbance just after crossing onto Thailand.
- 06:00 UTC
  - At 16.7°N 135.7°E – The JMA upgrades Goni to a severe tropical storm as it starts a period of rapid intensification.
  - At 16.8°N 135.6°E – The JTWC determines Goni has attained Category 1 typhoon status.
- 10:00 UTC (18:00 PHT) – The PAGASA reports Typhoon Goni has entered the PAR, naming it Rolly.
- 12:00 UTC
  - At 16.7°N 134.5°E – The JMA upgrades Goni (Rolly) further to a typhoon.
  - At 16.6°N 134.5°E – The JTWC reports Goni (Rolly) has strengthened further to a Category 2 typhoon.
- 18:00 UTC at 16.3°N 133.4°E – The JTWC upgrades Goni (Rolly) further to a Category 4 typhoon as it continues to rapidly intensify while slightly moving west-southwestward.

October 30

- 00:00 UTC
  - At 16.3°N 132.7°E – The JTWC reports Goni (Rolly) has achieved super-typhoon status as it nears the Philippines.
  - (08:00 PHT) at 16.4°N 132.7°E – The PAGASA also determines Goni (Rolly) has intensified to a super typhoon.
- 06:00 UTC at 16.3°N 131.5°E – The JTWC assesses Goni (Rolly) has intensified further to a Category 5 super typhoon as it continues on a west-southwestward track.
- 12:00 UTC at 11.5°N 142.9°E – The JMA starts tracking another tropical depression southwest of Guam.
- 18:00 UTC at 12.5°N 141.9°E – The JMA analyzes the tropical depression southwest of Guam has slightly deepened to a central pressure of 1,002 hPa (1,002 mbar; 29.59 inHg) as it moves northwestward.

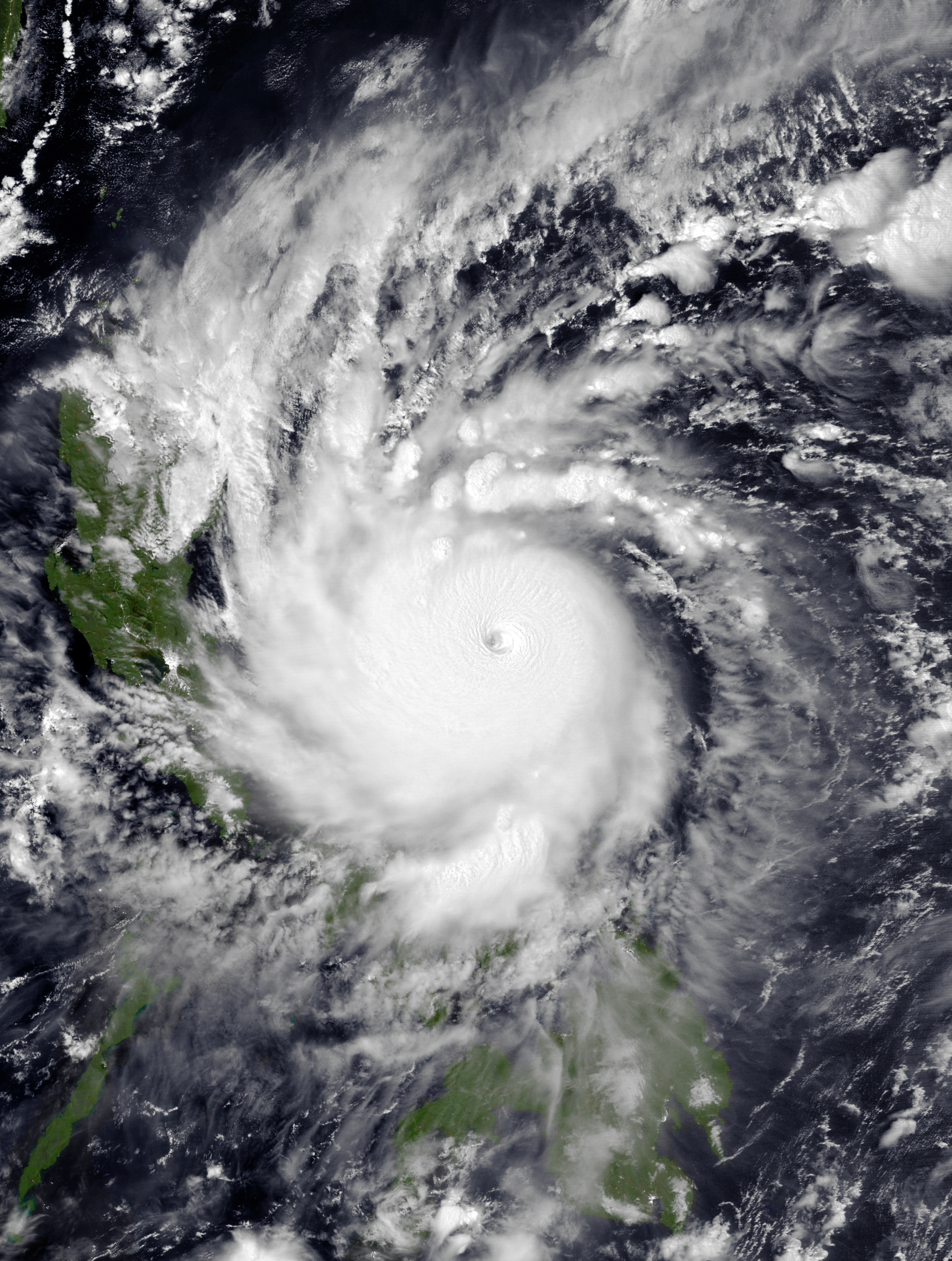
Goni near its peak intensity about to make landfall in the Philippines on October 31.

Goni making landfall on Catanduanes on October 31.

October 31

- 00:00 UTC at 15.3°N 128.8°E – The JTWC analyzes Goni (Rolly) has deepened to a sub-900 central pressure, at 895 hPa (895.0 mbar; 26.43 inHg) as it moves towards the Bicol Region.
- 06:00 UTC at 13.9°N 138.8°E – The JMA reports the tropical depression now west-northwest of Guam has re-attained a central pressure of 1,002 hPa (1,002 mbar; 29.59 inHg).
- 12:00 UTC at 14.7°N 137.1°E – The JTWC starts tracking the tropical depression west-northwest of Guam, designating it 23W.
- 18:00 UTC
  - At 13.8°N 125.0°E – The JMA reports Typhoon Goni (Rolly) has attained its peak with maximum 10-minute sustained winds of 120 knots (220 km/h; 140 mph) and a minimum central pressure of 905 hPa (905.0 mbar; 26.72 inHg) as it nears Catanduanes.
  - At 13.6°N 125.1°E – The JTWC also determines Super Typhoon Goni (Rolly) has peaked with maximum 1-minute sustained winds of 170 knots (310 km/h; 200 mph) and a minimum central pressure of 884 hPa (884.0 mbar; 26.10 inHg) as it is about to make landfall.
  - (02:00 PHT, November 1) at 13.7°N 125.0°E – The PAGASA also assesses Super Typhoon Goni (Rolly) with maximum 10-minute sustained winds of 120 knots (220 km/h; 140 mph) and a minimum central pressure of 905 hPa (905.0 mbar; 26.72 inHg).
  - At 15.3°N 135.9°E – The JTWC analyzes 23W has attained an initial peak with 1-minute winds of 30 knots (56 km/h; 35 mph) and a central pressure of 1,004 hPa (1,004 mbar; 29.65 inHg) as it is about to enter the PAR.
- 20:50 UTC (04:50 PHT, November 1) at 13.6°N 124.3°E – Super Typhoon Goni (Rolly) hits Bato, Catanduanes.
- 22:00 UTC (06:00 PHT, November 1) – The PAGASA reports 23W has entered the PAR, naming it Siony.
- 23:20 UTC (07:20 PHT, November 1) at 13.5°N 123.7°E – After briefly crossing Lagonoy Gulf, Super Typhoon Goni (Rolly) makes another landfall on Tiwi, Albay.

=== November ===
November 1

- 00:00 UTC at 13.5°N 123.6°E – The JTWC reports Goni (Rolly) has rapidly weakened to a Category 4 super typhoon upon making landfall in Albay.
- 03:00 UTC (11:00 PHT) at 13.5°N 122.8°E – Now over Ragay Gulf, PAGASA downgrades Goni (Rolly) to a typhoon.
- 04:00 UTC (12:00 PHT) at 13.6°N 122.6°E – Typhoon Goni (Rolly) makes another hit on San Narciso, Quezon.
- 06:00 UTC
  - At 13.7°N 121.9°E – The JMA reports Goni (Rolly) has rapidly weakened to a severe tropical storm after emerging over Tayabas Bay.
  - At 13.6°N 122.2°E – The JTWC determines Goni (Rolly) has continued to rapidly weaken and is now a Category 1 typhoon.
- 08:00 UTC (16:00 PHT) at 14.0°N 121.7°E – Goni (Rolly) makes its fourth landfall on Pagbilao, Quezon.
- 09:00 UTC (17:00 PHT) at 14.1°N 121.6°E – The PAGASA downgrades Goni (Rolly) further to a severe tropical storm as it continues to move inland.
- 12:00 UTC
  - At 14.3°N 121.3°E – The JMA reports Goni (Rolly) has weakened further to a tropical storm as it nears Metro Manila.
  - At 14.1°N 121.2°E – The JTWC also assesses that Goni (Rolly) has deteriorated further to a tropical storm.
  - (20:00 PHT) at 14.3°N 121.1°E – The PAGASA follows suit, downgrading Goni (Rolly) to a tropical storm over Cavite Province.
  - At 16.9°N 131.6°E – The JTWC assesses 23W (Siony) has briefly deepened to a central pressure of 1,004 hPa (1,004 mbar; 29.65 inHg) as it continues to move northwestward over the Philippine Sea.
- 18:00 UTC (02:00 PHT, November 2) at 14.5°N 119.6°E – The PAGASA downgrades Goni (Rolly) further to a tropical depression now over the South China Sea.

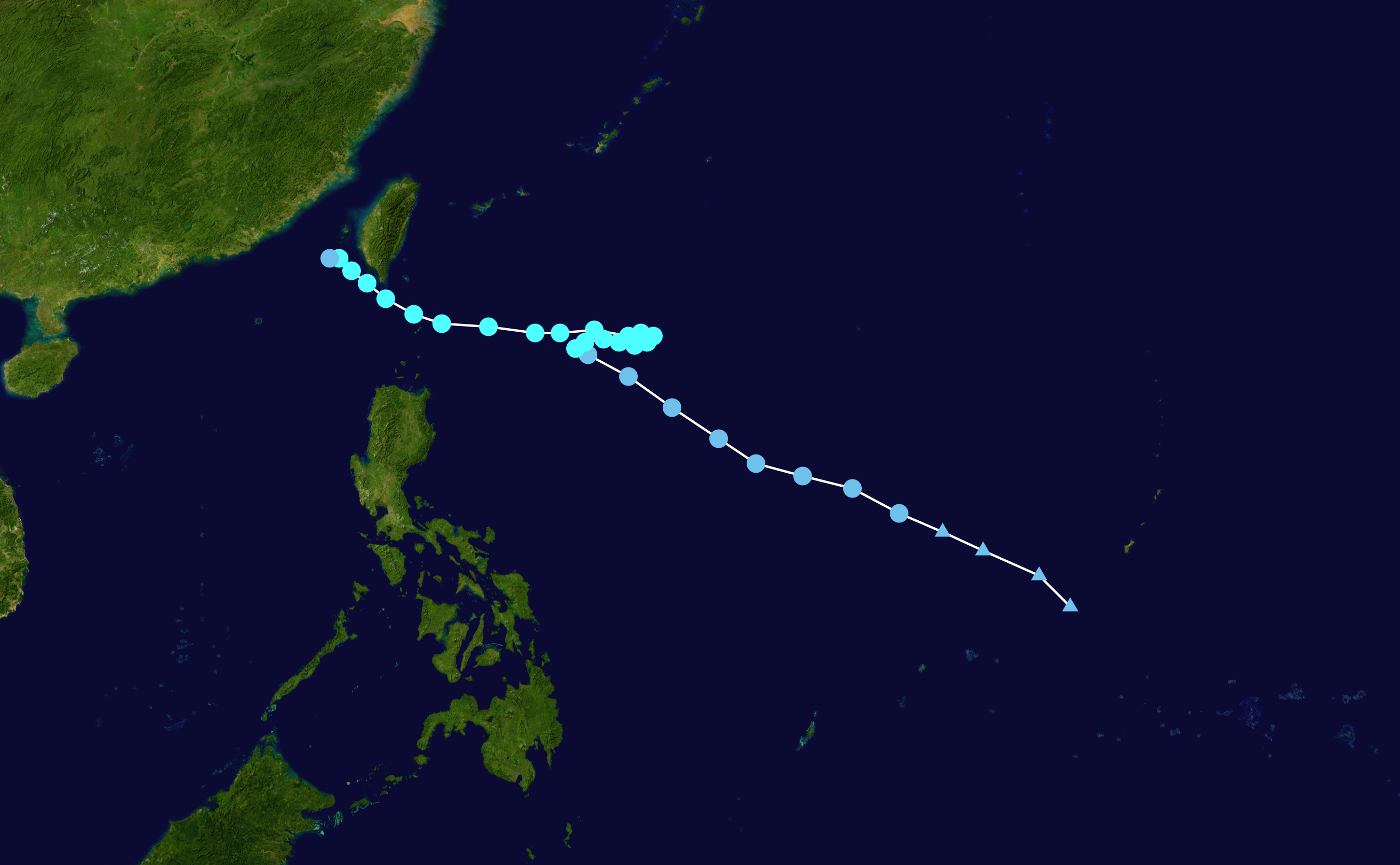
Track of Atsani during early November.

November 2

- 00:00 UTC at 14.7°N 118.5°E – The JTWC also downgrades Goni (Rolly) to a tropical depression as it nears Scarborough Shoal.
- 12:00 UTC (20:00 PHT)
  - At 15.1°N 116.9°E – The JTWC reports Goni (Rolly) has re-intensified to a tropical storm, slightly deepening to a central pressure of 1,000 hPa (1,000 mbar; 29.53 inHg).
  - At 15.2°N 116.8°E – The PAGASA follows suit, re-upgrading Goni (Rolly) to a tropical storm with 10-minute winds of 35 knots (65 km/h; 40 mph) and a central pressure of 1,000 hPa (1,000 mbar; 29.53 inHg) after moving close or over Scarborough Shoal.
  - At 19.8°N 127.0°E – The JTWC upgrades 23W (Siony) to a tropical storm, deepening to a central pressure of 1,002 hPa (1,002 mbar; 29.59 inHg) as it slows down and turns eastward.
  - At 19.7°N 127.5°E – The PAGASA follows suit, upgrading 23W (Siony) to a tropical storm over the Philippine Sea.
- 18:00 UTC at 19.8°N 127.1°E – The JMA reports 23W (Siony) has strengthened to a tropical storm, naming it Atsani.

November 3

- 00:00 UTC at 14.8°N 115.4°E – The JTWC assesses Goni (Rolly) has slightly deepened to a central pressure of 1,002 hPa (1,002 mbar; 29.59 inHg) as it decelerates over the South China Sea.
- 06:00 UTC
  - At 14.7°N 115.2°E – The JTWC analyzes Goni (Rolly) has attained 1-minute winds of 40 knots (74 km/h; 46 mph), but this was short-lived.
  - At 20.0°N 128.4°E – The JTWC assesses that Atsani (Siony) has slightly deepened to a central pressure of 1,003 hPa (1,003 mbar; 29.62 inHg) as it continues to slowly move eastwards.
- 12:00 UTC (20:00 PHT) at 14.8°N 114.9°E – The PAGASA reports Tropical Storm Goni (Rolly) has exited the PAR.

November 4

- 06:00 UTC
  - At 14.3°N 113.3°E – The JMA reports Goni has attained a second peak as a mid-tropical storm with 10-minute winds of 40 knots (74 km/h; 46 mph) and a central pressure of 1,000 hPa (1,000 mbar; 29.53 inHg).
  - At 14.4°N 113.3°E – The JTWC also assesses Goni to have re-intensified, re-attaining 1-minute winds of 40 knots (74 km/h; 46 mph) and a central pressure of 1,000 hPa (1,000 mbar; 29.53 inHg).
- 12:00 UTC (20:00 PHT) at 20.2°N 128.7°E – The JMA, JTWC, and PAGASA report Atsani (Siony) has strengthened further to a severe tropical storm and has peaked with 10-minute and 1-minute winds of 50 knots (93 km/h; 58 mph) and a central pressure of 992 hPa (992.0 mbar; 29.29 inHg), except for the JTWC assessing it at 993 hPa (993.0 mbar; 29.32 inHg), as it sets on a westward heading.
- 18:00 UTC at 14.3°N 112.1°E – The JTWC analyzes Goni re-deepened to a central pressure of 1,000 hPa (1,000 mbar; 29.53 inHg) as it approaches Vietnam.

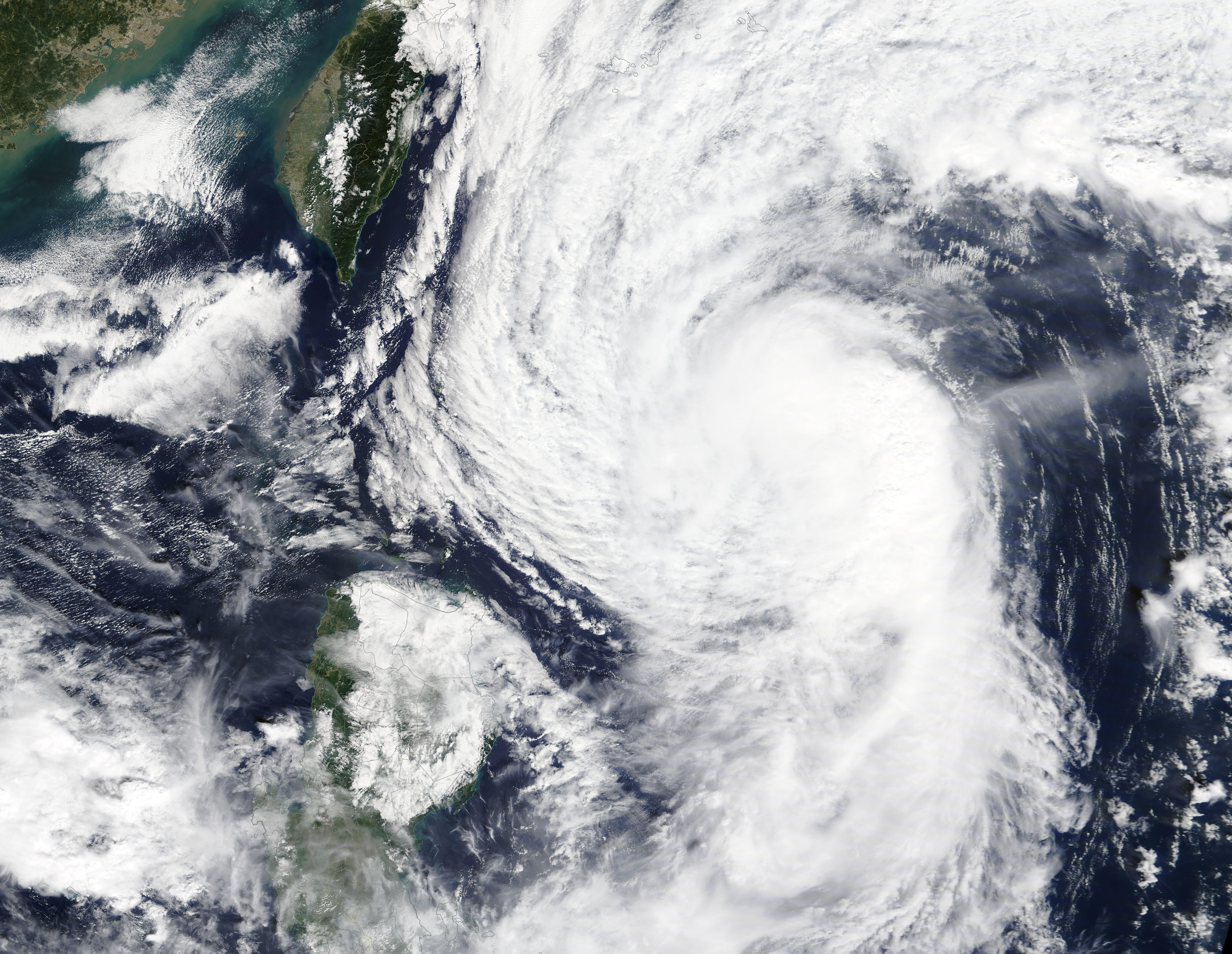
True-color satellite image of Atsani at its peak intensity while approaching the Batanes Islands on November 5.

November 5

- 06:00 UTC at 14.0°N 111.4°E – The JTWC reports Goni has weakened to a tropical depression.
- 12:00 UTC at 13.8°N 110.9°E – The JMA also downgrades Goni to a tropical depression as it is about to make landfall in Vietnam.

November 6

- 00:00 UTC at 20.9°N 121.8°E – While making its closest approach to Batanes Islands, the JTWC reports Atsani (Siony) re-attained its highest 1-minute winds of 50 knots (93 km/h; 58 mph), but with a much higher central pressure of 1,002 hPa (1,002 mbar; 29.59 inHg).
- 00:40 UTC (07:40 ICT) at 14.2°N 109.0°E – Tropical Depression Goni makes its final landfall on Bình Định province.
- 06:00 UTC
  - At 14.7°N 107.2°E – The JMA stops tracking Goni as it subsequently dissipates over southern Laos six hours later.
  - At 14.2°N 108.7°E – The JTWC reports Goni has degenerated to a tropical disturbance as it moves further inland.
- 12:00 UTC
  - At 21.9°N 120.3°E – Now making its closest approach to Taiwan's southern tip, the JTWC reports Atsani (Siony) has re-attained again its highest 1-minute winds of 50 knots (93 km/h; 58 mph), but with a slightly lower central pressure of 1,001 hPa (1,001 mbar; 29.56 inHg).
  - (20:00 PHT) at 10.0°N 130.7°E – The JMA and PAGASA start tracking a tropical depression east-northeast of Mindanao, with the latter naming it Tonyo.
- 16:00 UTC (00:00 PHT, November 7) – Tropical Storm Atsani (Siony) exits the PAR.
- 18:00 UTC
  - At 22.3°N 119.7°E – The JMA reports Atsani has weakened to a tropical storm as it moves northwestward southwest of Taiwan.
  - At 10.7°N 129.3°E – The JMA assesses Tonyo has slightly deepened to a central pressure of 1,006 hPa (1,006 mbar; 29.71 inHg) as it moves towards Samar.

November 7

- 06:00 UTC
  - At 22.7°N 119.2°E – The JMA stops tracking Atsani as it weakens to a tropical depression and subsequently dissipates six hours later near Taiwan Strait
  - At 22.7°N 119.1°E – The JTWC follows suit, downgrading Atsani to a tropical depression and last noting the system.
- 07:30 UTC (15:30 PHT) at 12.4°N 125.3°E – Tropical Depression Tonyo hits Gamay, Northern Samar.
- 10:30 UTC (18:30 PHT) at 12.7°N 124.4°E – Tropical Depression Tonyo makes another hit on Biri, Northern Samar.
- 11:50 UTC (19:50 PHT) – After briefly crossing the San Bernardino Strait, Tonyo makes its third landfall on the border of Santa Magdalena and Bulusan, Sorsogon.
- 12:00 UTC at 13.0°N 123.7°E – The JMA reports Tonyo has deepened to a lower central pressure of 1,004 hPa (1,004 mbar; 29.65 inHg) as it crosses the Bicol Peninsula.
- 16:00 UTC (00:00 PHT, November 8) at 13.1°N 123.0°E – Tropical Depression Tonyo makes another hit on San Pascual (Burias Island), Masbate.
- 17:50 UTC (01:50 PHT, November 8) at 13.4°N 122.5°E – Tropical Depression Tonyo hits the Bondoc Peninsula, in the vicinity of San Francisco, Quezon.
- 19:40 UTC (03:40 PHT, November 8) at 13.3°N 122.1°E – Tonyo makes another hit on the island province of Marinduque, in the vicinity of Torrijos.
- 23:00 UTC (07:00 PHT, November 8) at 13.4°N 121.0°E – After traversing the northern reaches of the Sibuyan Sea, Tonyo makes its seventh hit on San Teodoro, Oriental Mindoro.

November 8

- 00:00 UTC at 8.2°N 135.2°E – The JMA marks the formation of a tropical depression near Palau.
- 01:00 UTC (09:00 PHT) – The PAGASA names the tropical depression near Palau, Ulysses, after entering the PAR.
- 06:00 UTC at 8.8°N 133.9°E – The JMA assesses Ulysses has slightly deepened to a central pressure of 1,006 hPa (1,006 mbar; 29.71 inHg) as it moves northwestward.
- 12:00 UTC at 12.5°N 117.0°E – The JTWC designates Tonyo as 24W as it now moves over the South China Sea.
- 18:00 UTC
  - At 12.9°N 115.4°E – The JMA reports 24W (Tonyo) has intensified to a tropical storm, naming it Etau.
  - (02:00 PHT, November 9) at 12.9°N 115.0°E – The PAGASA also upgrades Etau (Tonyo) to a tropical storm with 10-minute sustained winds of 35 knots (65 km/h; 40 mph) and a central pressure of 998 hPa (998.0 mbar; 29.47 inHg) as it is about to exit the PAR.
- 19:00 UTC (03:00 PHT, November 9) – The PAGASA reports Etau (Tonyo) has left the PAR.

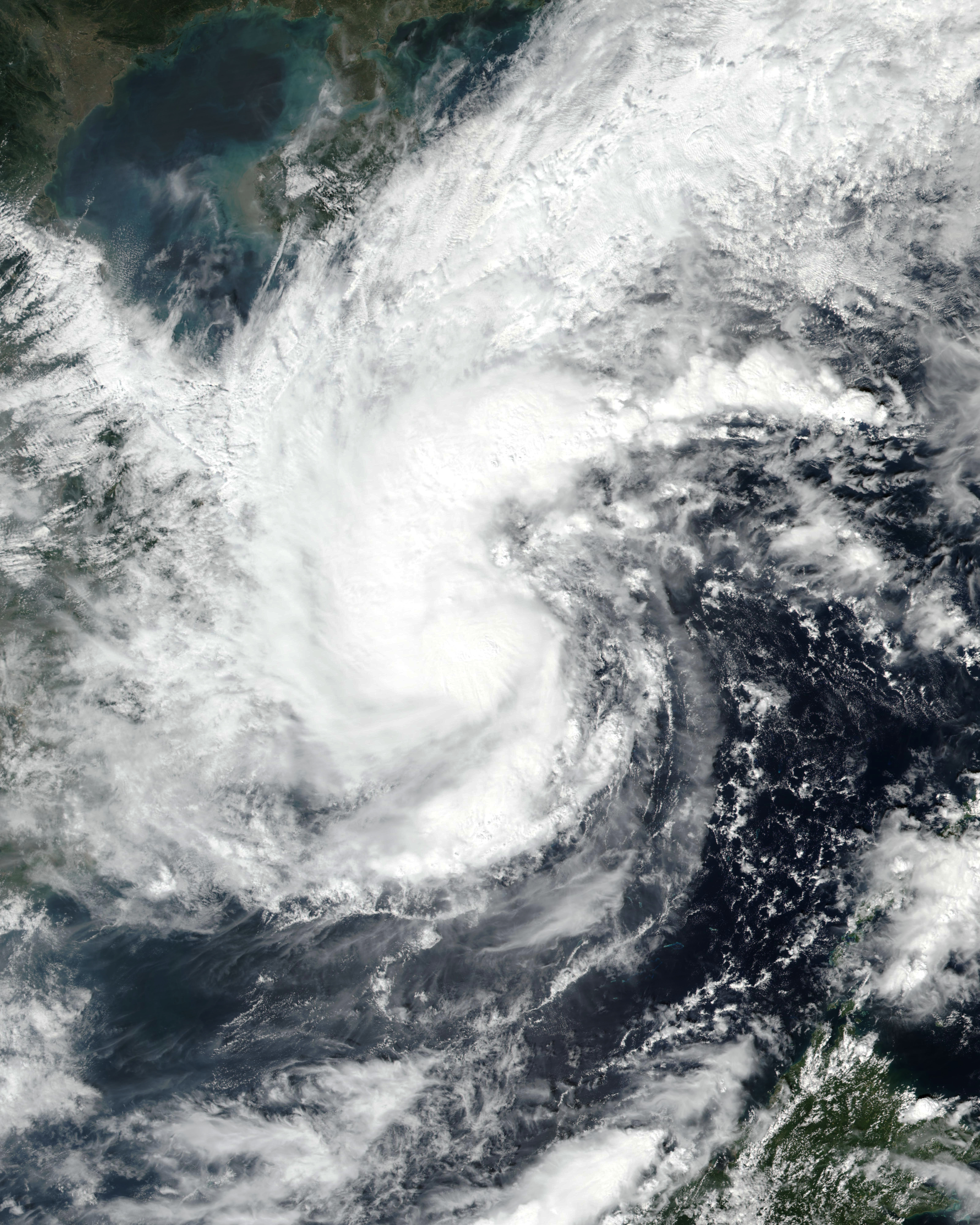
Etau near its peak intensity as it approaches Vietnam on November 9.

November 9

- 00:00 UTC at 12.9°N 113.3°E – The JTWC upgrades Etau to a tropical storm as it continues to move westward.
- 06:00 UTC
  - At 12.5°N 112.0°E – The JMA reports Etau has peaked with 10-minute winds of 45 knots (83 km/h; 52 mph) and a central pressure of 992 hPa (992.0 mbar; 29.29 inHg) as it decelerates while approaching Vietnam.
  - At 12.9°N 112.2°E – The JTWC also assesses Etau has attained 1-minute winds of 45 knots (83 km/h; 52 mph) and a central pressure of 996 hPa (996.0 mbar; 29.41 inHg).
  - At 12.0°N 130.8°E – The JTWC starts tracking Ulysses, designating it as 25W.
- 12:00 UTC
  - At 11.9°N 130.4°E – The JMA reports 25W (Ulysses) has strengthened to Tropical Storm Vamco.
  - (20:00 PHT) at 11.9°N 130.5°E – The PAGASA also upgrades Vamco (Ulysses) to a tropical storm as it continues to move northwestward.
- 18:00 UTC at 12.3°N 110.9°E – While maintaining its maximum 1-minute winds, the JTWC reports Etau has deepened to a lower central pressure of 995 hPa (995.0 mbar; 29.38 inHg).

November 10

- 00:00 UTC at 13.3°N 128.3°E – The JTWC upgrades Vamco (Ulysses) to a tropical storm as it nears the Philippines.
- 03:00 UTC (10:00 ICT) at 12.5°N 109.1°E – Tropical Storm Etau makes its final landfall on Ninh Hòa, Khánh Hòa.
- 06:00 UTC at 12.6°N 109.0°E – The JTWC reports Etau has weakened to a tropical depression as it moves further inland.
- 12:00 UTC
  - At 14.5°N 126.6°E – The JMA determines Vamco (Ulysses) has intensified further to a severe tropical storm.
  - (20:00 PHT) at 14.4°N 126.6°E – The PAGASA also upgrades Vamco (Ulysses) to a severe tropical storm as it turns on a westerly heading.
  - At 12.6°N 107.4°E – The JMA also downgrades Etau to a tropical depression now over Cambodia.
- 18:00 UTC
  - At 12.4°N 106.4°E – The JMA last notes Etau as it dissipates, subsequently weakening to a low-pressure area the next day.
  - At 12.5°N 106.6°E – The JTWC downgrades Etau further to a tropical disturbance.

November 11

- 00:00 UTC
  - At 14.6°N 124.6°E – The JMA and JTWC upgrade Vamco (Ulysses) to a Category 1 typhoon as it makes its closest pass to Catanduanes.
  - (08:00 PHT) at 14.7°N 124.6°E – The PAGASA follows suit, upgrading Vamco (Ulysses) to a typhoon.
- 06:00 UTC at 14.5°N 123.5°E – The JTWC reports Vamco (Ulysses) has intensified further to a Category 2 typhoon as it slightly shifts west-southwestward, nearing the Bicol Peninsula.
- 12:00 UTC
  - At 14.8°N 122.8°E – After making its closest approach to the Calaguas Islands, the JMA determines Vamco (Ulysses) has attained its pre-landfall peak with 10-minute winds of 75 knots (139 km/h; 86 mph) and a central pressure of 965 hPa (965.0 mbar; 28.50 inHg).
  - At 14.6°N 122.9°E – The JTWC upgrades Vamco (Ulysses) further to a Category 3 typhoon, simultaneously peaking with 1-minute winds of 100 knots (190 km/h; 120 mph) and a central pressure of 960 hPa (960.0 mbar; 28.35 inHg).
  - (20:00 PHT) at 14.7°N 122.8°E – The PAGASA also assesses Vamco (Ulysses) with 10-minute winds of 75 knots (139 km/h; 86 mph) and a central pressure of 965 hPa (965.0 mbar; 28.50 inHg) as it moves towards the Polilo Islands.
- 14:40 UTC (22:40 PHT) at 14.9°N 122.2°E – Typhoon Vamco (Ulysses) passes over the island of Pandanan of Burdeos, Quezon.
- 14:50 UTC (22:50 PHT) at 14.9°N 122.1°E – Typhoon Vamco (Ulysses) makes another hit on the nearby Malaguioan Island.
- 15:20 UTC (23:20 PHT) at 14.8°N 122.0°E – Typhoon Vamco (Ulysses) hits Polillo Island, in the town of Burdeos, Quezon.
- 17:40 UTC (01:40 PHT, November 12) at 14.8°N 121.6°E – After briefly crossing Polillo Strait, Typhoon Vamco (Ulysses) hits mainland Luzon, at General Nakar, Quezon.
- 18:00 UTC at 15.0°N 121.4°E – The JTWC reports Vamco (Ulysses) has weakened to a Category 2 typhoon upon making landfall.
- 21:00 UTC (05:00 PHT, November 12) at 15.2°N 120.6°E – The PAGASA downgrades Vamco (Ulysses) to a severe tropical storm as it continues to cross Central Luzon.

November 12

- 00:00 UTC
  - At 15.2°N 119.6°E – After re-emerging back over water, the JMA determines Vamco (Ulysses) has deteriorated to a severe tropical storm.
  - At 15.2°N 119.5°E – The JTWC reports Vamco (Ulysses) has weakened to a Category 1 typhoon.

November 13

- 00:00 UTC (08:00 PHT) at 15.3°N 115.4°E – The PAGASA reports Vamco (Ulysses) has re-strengthened to a typhoon, assessing it with 10-minute winds of 65 knots (120 km/h; 75 mph) and a central pressure of 975 hPa (975.0 mbar; 28.79 inHg) as it is about to exit the PAR.
- 01:00 UTC (09:00 PHT) – The PAGASA reports Vamco (Ulysses) has exited the PAR while continuing to traverse the South China Sea.
- 12:00 UTC at 15.5°N 113.4°E – The JMA reports Vamco has regained typhoon strength while the JTWC determines the system rapidly re-strengthened to Category 3 typhoon status as it moves westward.
- 18:00 UTC at 15.5°N 112.4°E – The JTWC assesses Vamco has further strengthened to a Category 4 typhoon, simultaneously peaking with 1-minute winds of 115 knots (213 km/h; 132 mph) and a central pressure of 945 hPa (945.0 mbar; 27.91 inHg).

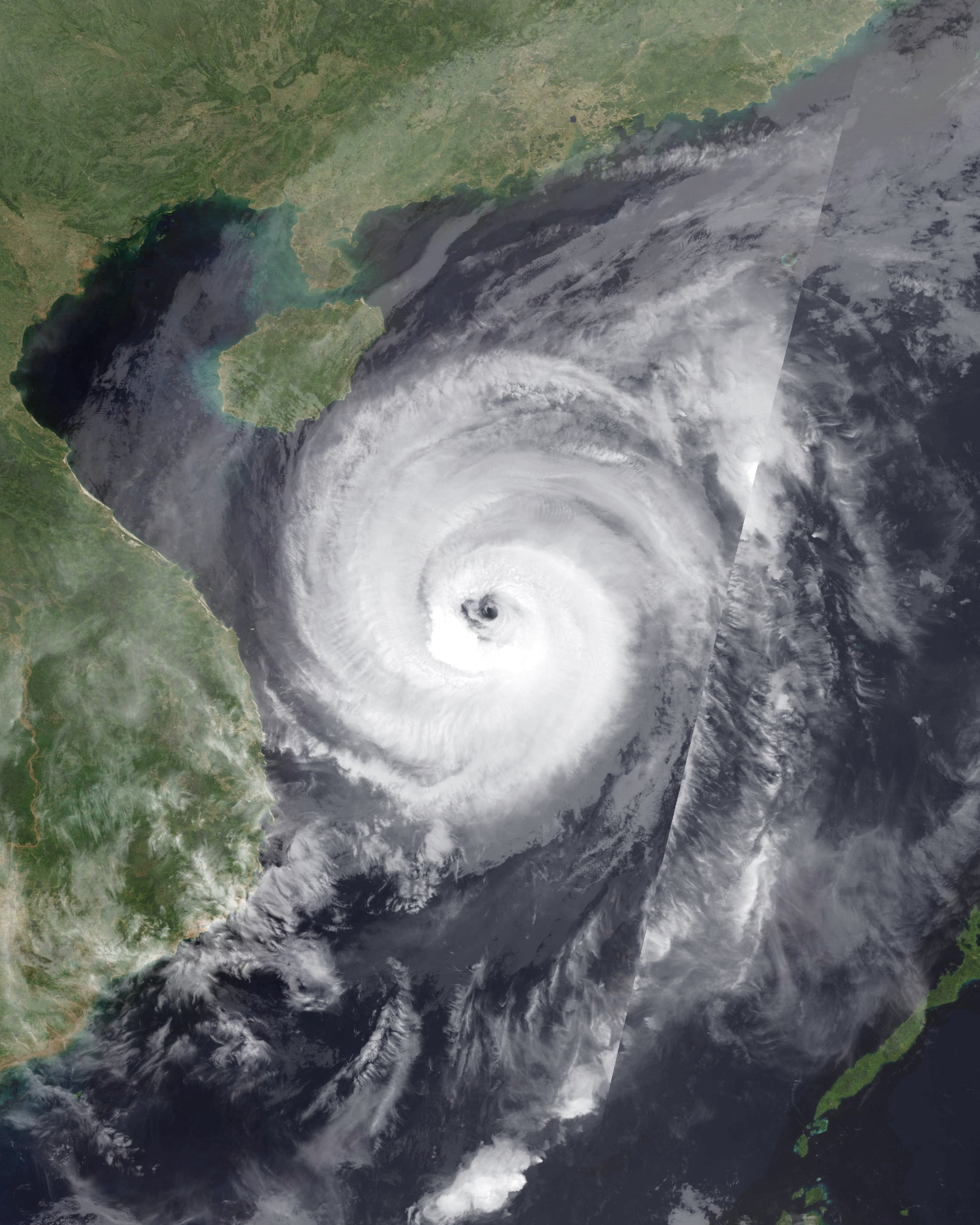
Vamco at its peak intensity moving over the South China Sea and approaching Vietnam on November 13.

November 14

- 00:00 UTC
  - At 15.8°N 111.4°E – The JMA reports Vamco has attained its peak intensity, with 10-minute winds of 85 knots (157 km/h; 98 mph) and a central pressure of 955 hPa (955.0 mbar; 28.20 inHg) as it nears Vietnam.
  - At 15.7°N 111.3°E – The JTWC assesses Vamco has leveled off from its peak and has weakened back to a Category 3 typhoon as it turns west-northwestward.
- 12:00 UTC at 16.3°N 109.4°E – The JTWC downgrades Vamco further to a Category 2 typhoon as it starts to parallel the Vietnamese coast.

November 15

- 00:00 UTC
  - At 17.1°N 107.9°E – The JMA downgrades Vamco further to a severe tropical storm.
  - At 17.1°N 107.6°E – The JTWC also downgrades Vamco to a Category 1 typhoon.
- 06:00 UTC
  - At 17.9°N 106.6°E – The JMA determines Vamco has weakened further to a tropical storm as it is about to make landfall.
  - At 17.7°N 106.7°E – The JTWC follows suit, downgrading Vamco to a tropical storm.
- 06:10 UTC (13:10 ICT) at 17.5°N 106.3°E – Tropical Storm Vamco makes its final landfall on Quang Binh province.
- 12:00 UTC at 18.1°N 105.9°E – The JMA downgrades Vamco further to a tropical depression after making landfall.
- 18:00 UTC at 18.2°N 104.1°E – The JTWC reports Vamco has weakened to a tropical depression near the border of Laos and Thailand.

November 16

- 00:00 UTC at 19.1°N 103.4°E – The JTWC last notes Vamco as it deteriorates inland.
- 06:00 UTC at 20.1°N 103.0°E – The JMA stops tracking Vamco as it would dissipate six hours later over Laos.

=== December ===
December 5

- 06:00 UTC at 22.0°N 135.3°E – The JMA marks a tropical depression northwest of Okinotori Island with a central pressure of 1,010 hPa (1,010 mbar; 29.83 inHg).
- 18:00 UTC at 22.7°N 135.9°E – The tropical depression now north of Okinotori Island re-attains its lowest central pressure of 1,010 hPa (1,010 mbar; 29.83 inHg).

December 6

- 06:00 UTC – The JMA last notes the tropical depression north of Okinotori Island as it merges with a stationary front; the system becomes unmarked six hours later.

December 18

- 00:00 UTC
  - At 7.2°N 127.2°E – The JMA reports the formation of a tropical depression near Mindanao.
  - (08:00 PHT) at 7.3°N 127.4°E – The PAGASA names the tropical depression near Mindanao, Vicky, as it moves towards the island.
- 03:00 UTC (11:00 PHT) at 7.6°N 127.0°E – The PAGASA reports Vicky has deepened to a central pressure of 1,002 hPa (1,002 mbar; 29.59 inHg) as it is about to make landfall.
- 05:40 UTC (13:40 PHT) at 7.9°N 126.4°E – Tropical Depression Vicky hits Boston, Davao Oriental.
- 06:00 UTC at 8.2°N 126.1°E – The JMA also assesses that Vicky has briefly deepened to a central pressure of 1,002 hPa (1,002 mbar; 29.59 inHg) as it traverses Mindanao.
- 13:40 UTC (21:40 PHT) at 8.6°N 123.7°E – After emerging over Iligan Bay, Tropical Depression Vicky makes another landfall on Plaridel, Misamis Occidental.

December 19

- 11:00 UTC (19:00 PHT) at 9.7°N 118.7°E – Vicky makes its third landfall at Puerto Princesa City in Palawan Island after traversing Sulu Sea.
- 12:00 UTC at 9.6°N 119.2°E – The JTWC starts tracking Vicky, designating it 26W with 1-minute winds of 25 knots (46 km/h; 29 mph) and a central pressure of 1,004 hPa (1,004 mbar; 29.65 inHg).
- 18:00 UTC at 10.0°N 117.4°E – The JTWC reports 26W (Vicky) has degenerated to a tropical disturbance over the South China Sea.

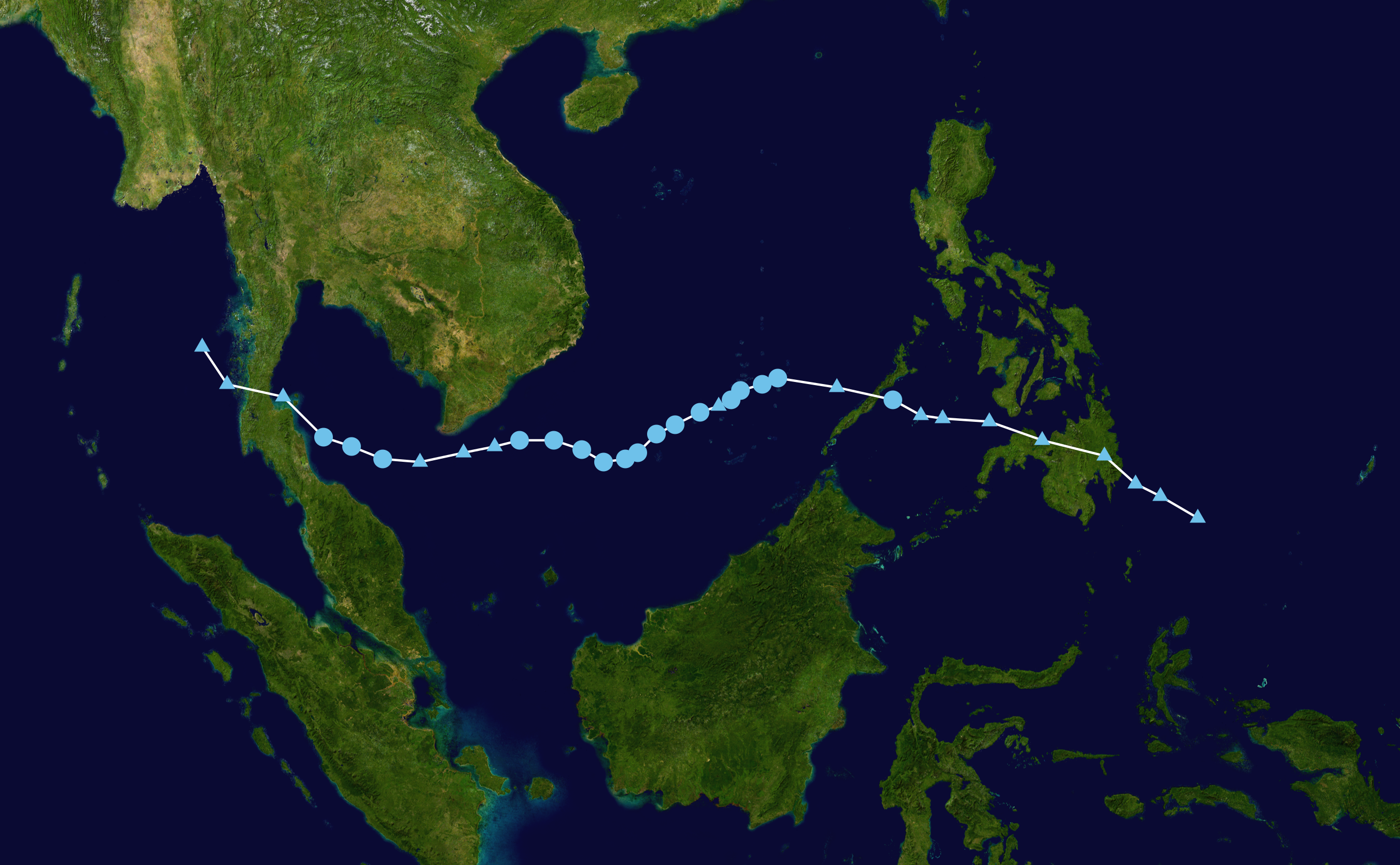
Track of Krovanh during mid-late December.

December 20

- 00:00 UTC
  - At 9.6°N 115.7°E – The JMA reports Ex-26W (Vicky) has intensified to a tropical storm, naming it Krovanh, with 10-minute winds of 35 knots (65 km/h; 40 mph).
  - (08:00 PHT) at 10.3°N 115.5°E – The JTWC determines Krovanh (Vicky) has regained tropical depression status, re-attaining 1-minute winds of 25 knots (46 km/h; 29 mph), while the PAGASA assesses the system has peaked with 10-minute winds of 30 knots (56 km/h; 35 mph) and a central pressure of 1,002 hPa (1,002 mbar; 29.59 inHg).
- 05:00 UTC (13:00 PHT) – The PAGASA reports Krovanh (Vicky) has left the PAR as it turns to the southwest.
- 06:00 UTC at 10.0°N 115.2°E – The JMA reports Krovanh has briefly deepened to its lowest central pressure of 1,000 hPa (1,000 mbar; 29.53 inHg).
- 18:00 UTC at 9.6°N 114.0°E – The JTWC assesses Krovanh has deepened to a lower central pressure of 1,003 hPa (1,003 mbar; 29.62 inHg).

December 21

- 00:00 UTC at 9.4°N 113.6°E – The JTWC determines Krovanh has degenerated again to a tropical disturbance as it traverses the southern South China Sea.
- 06:00 UTC at 9.2°N 113.0°E – The JTWC re-upgrades Krovanh to a tropical depression with 1-minute winds of 25 knots (46 km/h; 29 mph) and a central pressure of 1,003 hPa (1,003 mbar; 29.62 inHg).

December 22

- 06:00 UTC at 7.7°N 110.6°E – The JMA reports Krovanh has weakened to a tropical depression as it shifts on a west-northwestward heading.

December 23

- 12:00 UTC at 8.1°N 106.4°E – For the third time, the JTWC downgrades Krovanh again to a tropical disturbance as it nears the Cà Mau Peninsula.

December 24

- 06:00 UTC
  - At 7.6°N 102.8°E – Now over the Gulf of Thailand, the JMA assesses Krovanh has briefly deepened to a central pressure of 1,004 hPa (1,004 mbar; 29.65 inHg).
  - At 7.7°N 102.8°E – The JTWC reports Krovanh has re-intensified to a tropical depression again.
- 12:00 UTC at 8.1°N 101.8°E – The JTWC determines Krovanh has slightly intensified and peaked with 1-minute winds of 30 knots (56 km/h; 35 mph) and a central pressure of 1,002 hPa (1,002 mbar; 29.59 inHg) as it approaches the Malay Peninsula.
- 22:00 UTC (05:00 ICT, December 25) at 9.5°N 100.0°E – Krovanh makes its final landfall at Ko Samui Island, Surat Thani.

December 25

- 00:00 UTC
  - At 9.9°N 99.6°E – The JMA stops tracking Krovanh as it had left 100°E, while attempting to make another landfall on Thailand.
  - At 9.7°N 99.6°E – The JTWC reports Krovanh has weakened to a tropical disturbance for the final time.

December 29

- 00:00 UTC at 10.1°N 115.0°E – The JMA marks a tropical depression over the South China Sea, near the Spratly Islands.
- 06:00 UTC at 10.5°N 114.1°E – The JMA assesses the tropical depression over the South China Sea has attained its lts minimum central pressure of 1,004 hPa (1,004 mbar; 29.65 inHg).
- 12:00 UTC at 10.8°N 113.0°E – The JMA last notes the tropical depression over the South China Sea as it weakens to a remnant low at 18 UTC.

December 31

- 23:59 UTC – The 2020 Pacific typhoon season officially ends.

== See also ==
- Timeline of the 2020 Pacific hurricane season
- Timeline of the 2020 Atlantic hurricane season
