= Typhoon Maysak (2020) =

Pacific typhoon in 2020

Typhoon Maysak (Julian)
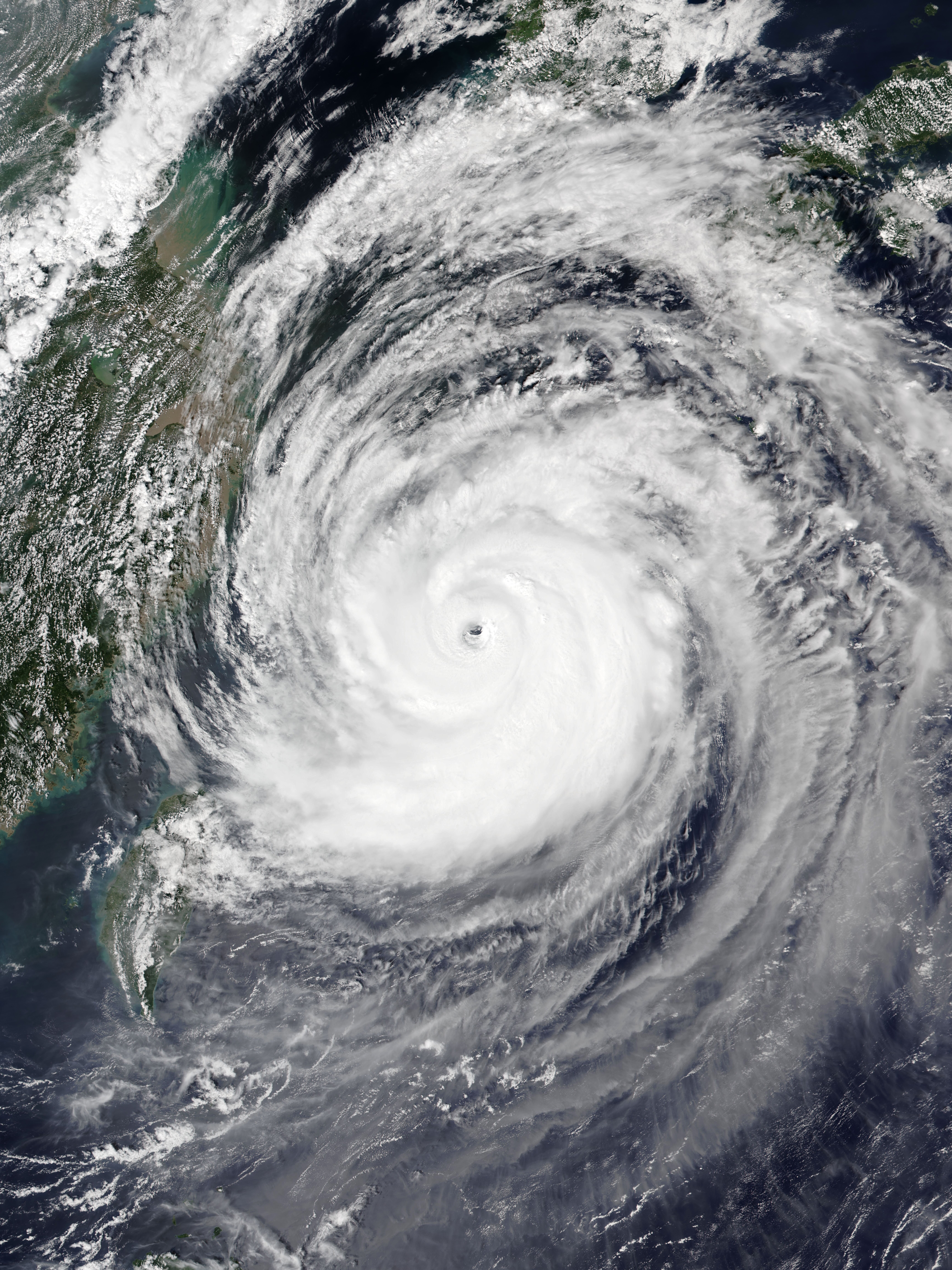
- Maysak at peak intensity over the Ryukyu Islands on September 1

Meteorological history
- Formed: August 27, 2020
- Extratropical: September 3, 2020
- Dissipated: September 7, 2020

Very strong typhoon
- 10-minute sustained (JMA)
- Highest winds: 175 km/h (110 mph)
- Lowest pressure: 935 hPa (mbar); 27.61 inHg

Category 4-equivalent typhoon
- 1-minute sustained (SSHWS/JTWC)
- Highest winds: 220 km/h (140 mph)
- Lowest pressure: 930 hPa (mbar); 27.46 inHg

Overall effects
- Fatalities: 46 total
- Damage: $100 million (2020 USD)
- Areas affected: Philippines, Korean Peninsula, Japan, Northeast China, Russian Far East
- IBTrACS
- Part of the 2020 Pacific typhoon season

Typhoon Maysak, known in the Philippines as Typhoon Julian, was a deadly, damaging and powerful tropical cyclone that struck the Ryukyu Islands and the Korean Peninsula in early September 2020. The third typhoon of the 2020 Pacific typhoon season, Maysak formed from a tropical disturbance. The disturbance gradually organized, receiving the name Julian from PAGASA as it became a tropical depression. As the depression strengthened, the JMA subsequently named the system Maysak. Maysak rapidly intensified into a strong typhoon before weakening and making landfall in South Korea.

Maysak was the second of three typhoons to affect the Korean Peninsula within two weeks, the others being Bavi and Haishen. It was also responsible for the loss of a livestock carrier Gulf Livestock 1, that sank 100 nautical miles West off from Amami Ōshima, Japan on September 2, 2020, taking 41 out of the 43 crew members on board.

== Meteorological history ==
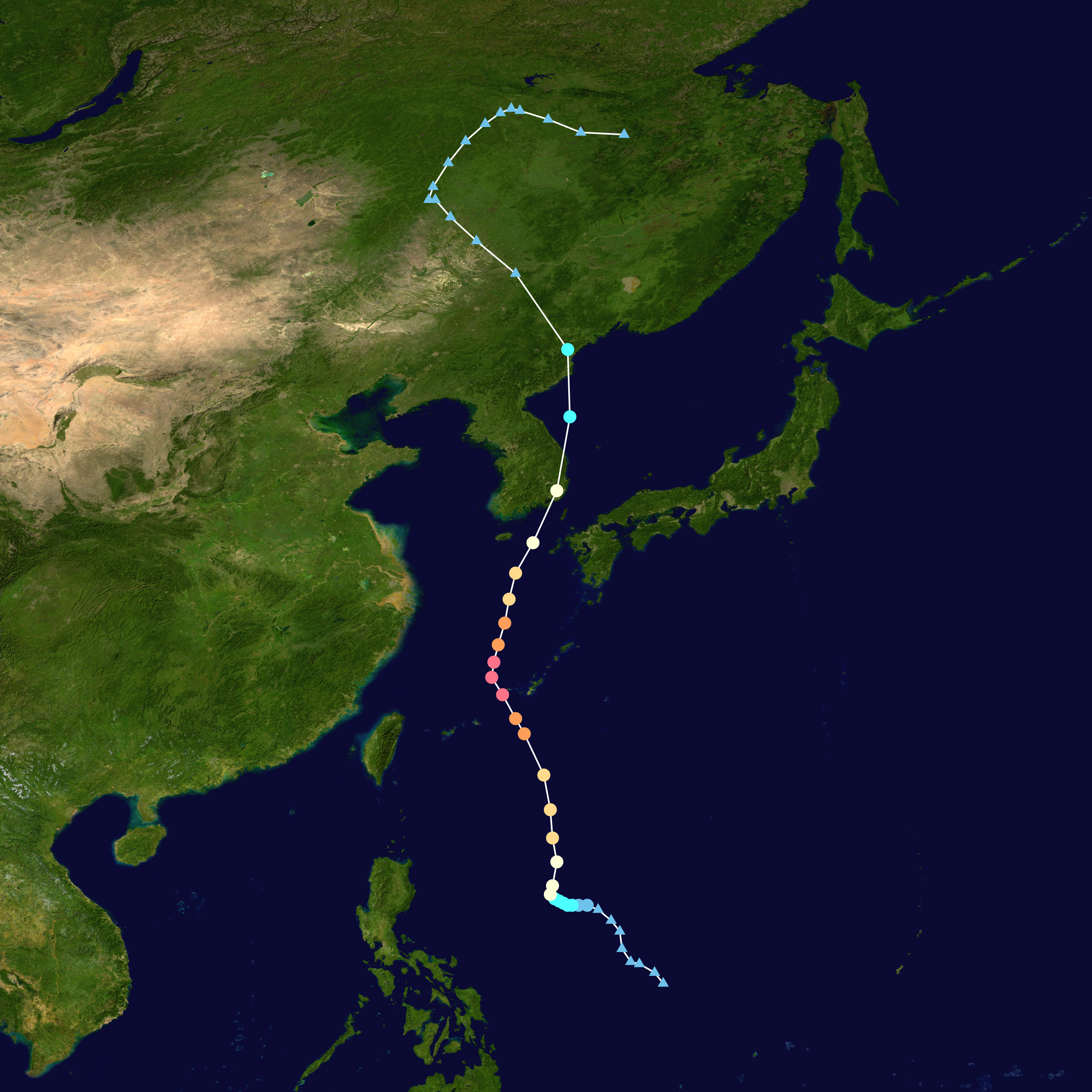
Map plotting the storm's track and intensity, according to the Saffir–Simpson scale Map key Saffir–Simpson scale Tropical depression (≤38 mph, ≤62 km/h) Tropical storm (39–73 mph, 63–118 km/h) Category 1 (74–95 mph, 119–153 km/h) Category 2 (96–110 mph, 154–177 km/h) Category 3 (111–129 mph, 178–208 km/h) Category 4 (130–156 mph, 209–251 km/h) Category 5 (≥157 mph, ≥252 km/h) Unknown Storm type Tropical cyclone Subtropical cyclone Extratropical cyclone, remnant low, tropical disturbance, or monsoon depression

Following the impacts of Typhoon Bavi on the Korean Peninsula in August 2020, the Korea Meteorological Administration (KMA) began to anticipate the development of a new tropical cyclone with the potential to be stronger and more damaging for the region than Bavi. The KMA assessed a high probability of the storm's development, but noted that its future impacts were uncertain; the Joint Typhoon Warning Center (JTWC) also determined that there was a high likelihood of a "significant tropical cyclone" developing. Maysak's precursor disturbance was an area of low pressure over the western Pacific east of the Philippines. At 06:00 UTC on August 27, the Japan Meteorological Agency determined that a nearly stationary tropical depression had formed near 15°N, 132°E. The JTWC issued a Tropical Cyclone Formation Alert for the system around the same time. The newly formed system was located in an environment conducive to storm development, including warm sea surface temperatures and low vertical wind shear. Clusters of atmospheric convection emerged around the storm's center, comprising formative rainbands wrapping into the developing circulation. Early on August 28, the Philippine Atmospheric, Geophysical and Astronomical Services Administration (PAGASA) assessed the system as a tropical depression with the local name Julian. At 06:00 UTC, the JMA assessed the tropical depression to have strengthened into a tropical storm, assigning it with the name Maysak. (Note: The name Maysak (Khmer: ម៉ៃសាក់, [maj.ˈsaʔ]) was contributed by Cambodia and means teak (Tectona grandis) in Khmer.) By this time, outflow had become established and curvature of the Maysak's rainbands became apparent on satellite imagery. The storm's cloud tops cooled substantially, indicative of further consolidation of its circulation. Maysak became a severe tropical storm twelve hours later. Maysak became a typhoon by 12:00 UTC on August 29 according to the JMA after developing an eye. The storm also began to move towards the north in response to a nearby subtropical ridge.

On August 30, Maysak's structure became indicative of an impending phase of rapid intensification according to the JTWC. The typhoon developed a central dense overcast that day with an eye embedded within. An approaching trough over eastern China and western Japan caused Maysak to accelerate towards the north as it continued to traverse energetic ocean waters. The typhoon's eye became symmetric and spanned 55 km (34 mi) across. By 21:00 UTC, the eye had contracted to a diameter of 19 km (12 mi). Around that time, the JTWC assessed the typhoon as having one-minute sustained winds of 215 km/h (134 mph). At 00:00 UTC on September 1, the JMA determined that Maysak had ten-minute maximum sustained winds of 110 mph (180 km/h) with gusts of up to 250 km/h (160 mph). The associated barometric pressure was estimated at 935 hPa (mbar; 27.61 inHg). Maysak held this intensity as it began to move into a less conducive environment for storm development within the East China Sea. Soon, Maysak began to weaken steadily as it passed the East China Sea, slowing back down to a Category 3 storm. The storm then made landfall near Busan, South Korea at 02:20 KST on September 3 (17:20 UTC on September 2), with 10-minute maximum sustained winds at 155 km/h (96 mph) and the central pressure at 950 hPa equivalent into a Category 2 typhoon. After that, it crossed the Sea of Japan and hitting North Korea into Jilin in northeast China. Soon after, Typhoon Maysak transitioned into an extratropical low in northeast China.

== Preparations and impact ==
The storm affected the eastern parts of South Korea, North Korea, China, and Russia, along with the Ryukyu Islands, causing at least 32 deaths and damage to more than 9,200 houses. Total combined economic losses were anticipated to surpass US$100 million.

=== Japan ===
The JMA urged residents of Okinawa to evacuate in anticipation of a potentially "major disaster" from Maysak; 560 people ultimately evacuated. The agency also warned of the possibility of tornadoes in the region. Schools, stores, and public offices throughout the prefecture closed. As many as 266 flights linking to Okinawa were cancelled, affecting roughly 9,200 travelers. The Naha Airport closed its passenger terminal in advance of Maysak. The cancellation of flights at Okinawa also led to the cancellation of 10 percent of departures from Haneda Airport. Kadena Air Force Base was placed on Tropical Cyclone Conditions of Readiness level 1 (TCCOR 1), denoting the onset of destructive winds. Okinawa was buffeted by wind gusts generally ranging between 100 and 130 km/h (62 and 81 mph). A peak gust of 163 km/h (101 mph) was measured in Nanjō. Wind gusts reached 195 km/h (121 mph) at Kumejima Airport. Power outages affected 1,580 electricity customers in Nago, Naha, and Nakijin. Agricultural damage across the prefecture were at JP¥236.4 million (US$2.23 million).

Officials in Kyushu warned of strong winds and mudslides. Maysak caused powerful winds and drenching rainfall to the Ryukyu Islands of Japan as it passed through, also causing some power outages. Agricultural damage in Saga Prefecture were calculated to be JP¥609 million (US$5.74 million).

==== Gulf Livestock 1 shipwreck ====
On 2 September 2020, Panamanian-flagged cargo ship Gulf Livestock 1 with 43 crew members, including 39 seamen from the Philippines, two from New Zealand and two from Australia, and thousands of cattle onboard was reported missing in the East China Sea. The Japan Coast Guard said it has found one person drifting in rough waters in a lifejacket. A distress signal was sent from the ship shortly before disappearing. The body of a person was found two days later. By October, the remaining 41 seamen were declared dead.

=== South Korea ===
In South Korea, 2,200 people were evacuated into shelters in preparation for Maysak. Maysak resulted in two deaths, caused over 120,000 power outages, and damaged over 5,100 hectares of farmland as well as a further 800 structures. South Korea's Ministry of Interior and Safety cited notable damage to nearly 2,000 buildings.

=== North Korea ===
Maysak brought heavy rainfall to eastern North Korea peaking at 15.157 inches (385.0 mm) in Wonsan. Photos showed streets and buildings being flooded in the area. North Korea's state television network once more broadcast live storm reports overnight from State Hydro-Meteorological Administration and outside as they had done with Typhoon Bavi just a week previous to Maysak.

=== China ===
The extratropical remnants of Maysak moved into Jilin, bringing heavy rains to the province. Damage was amounted to be CN¥6.18 million (US$903 thousand).

=== Russia ===
Maysak struck the Primorsky Krai as an extratropical cyclone, which killed three people and led to ₽200 million (US$2.65 million) in losses.

== See also ==
- Weather of 2020
- Tropical cyclones in 2020
- Other typhoons named Maysak
- Typhoon Maemi (2003) – A powerful storm that affected South Korea with a similar intensity
- Typhoon Lingling (2019) – Had a very similar track
- Typhoon Khanun (2023) – Another powerful and erratic storm that struck the west coast of Korean Peninsula
