= Typhoon Haishen (2020) =

Pacific typhoon in 2020

Typhoon Haishen (Kristine)
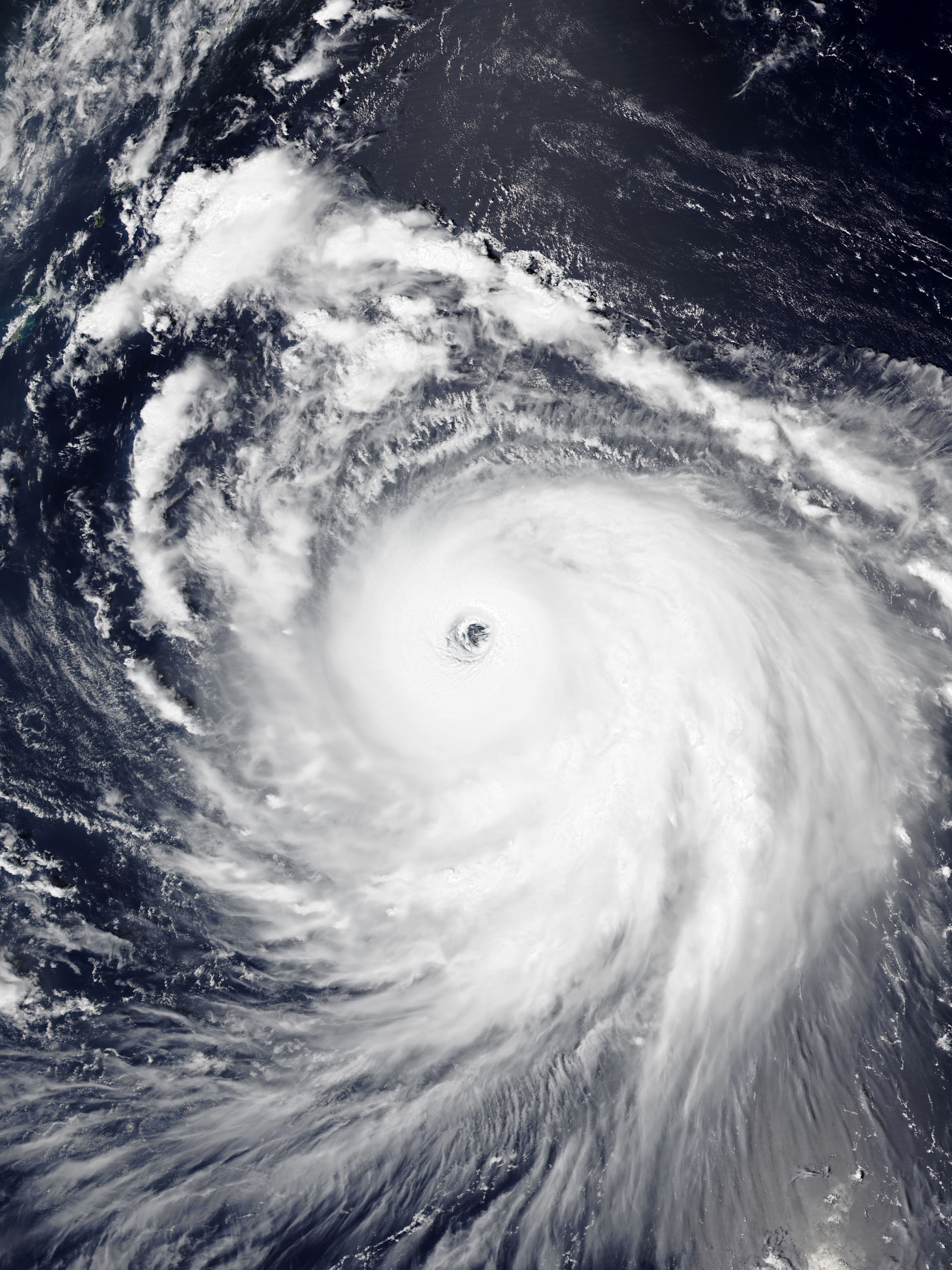
- Typhoon Haishen at peak intensity on September 4

Meteorological history
- Formed: August 30, 2020
- Extratropical: September 7, 2020
- Dissipated: September 10, 2020

Violent typhoon
- 10-minute sustained (JMA)
- Highest winds: 195 km/h (120 mph)
- Lowest pressure: 910 hPa (mbar); 26.87 inHg

Category 4-equivalent super typhoon
- 1-minute sustained (SSHWS/JTWC)
- Highest winds: 250 km/h (155 mph)
- Lowest pressure: 915 hPa (mbar); 27.02 inHg

Overall effects
- Fatalities: 4 total
- Missing: 6
- Damage: >$100 million (2020 USD)
- Areas affected: Mariana Islands, Japan, South Korea, North Korea, Northeastern China
- IBTrACS
- Part of the 2020 Pacific typhoon season

Typhoon Haishen, known in the Philippines as Typhoon Kristine, was a powerful tropical cyclone that became the first super typhoon of the 2020 Pacific typhoon season. Haishen, which is also the season's tenth named storm and the fifth typhoon, originated from a disorganized low-pressure area situated near Guam. As the disturbance tracked southwestward and quickly organized, the Joint Typhoon Warning Center (JTWC) issued a Tropical Cyclone Formation Alert (TCFA) on the system, and a day later, on September 1, the system intensified into a tropical depression. Then, the Japan Meteorological Agency (JMA) upgraded the system to a tropical storm, naming it Haishen as it moved southwestward. At about 12:00 UTC on September 2, the Philippine Atmospheric, Geological and Astronomical Services Administration (PAGASA) indicated that Haishen had entered the Philippine Area of Responsibility (PAR) and assigned the local name Kristine. Later that day, Haishen became a typhoon. On September 3, while drifting northwestward into extremely favorable conditions, Haishen underwent significant intensification, becoming a Category 3-equivalent typhoon and developing a pinhole eye before entering an eyewall replacement cycle (EWRC). Strengthening resumed shortly afterward, and the JTWC estimated peak sustained winds at 155 mph (250 km/h) as the storm reached Category 4 super typhoon status with a new, symmetrical, and clear eye.

Traversing northward toward land while gaining latitude, ocean heat content became unfavorable for supporting such a strong system, and while the central pressure decreased, the system's wind speeds began decreasing, as the structure began degrading. The eye's former shape was no longer present as it appeared ragged on satellite imagery, and Dvorak analysis indicated that Haishen was beginning to weaken steadily. On September 5, Haishen began to lose its eye as its inner eyewall began contracting, and it subsequently weakened to a category 3-equivalent typhoon. On September 6, Haishen made landfall on Japan and South Korea as a strong category 2-equivalent typhoon.

Haishen was the third typhoon within a span of two weeks to make landfall in the Korean Peninsula, the others being Bavi and Maysak.

== Meteorological history ==
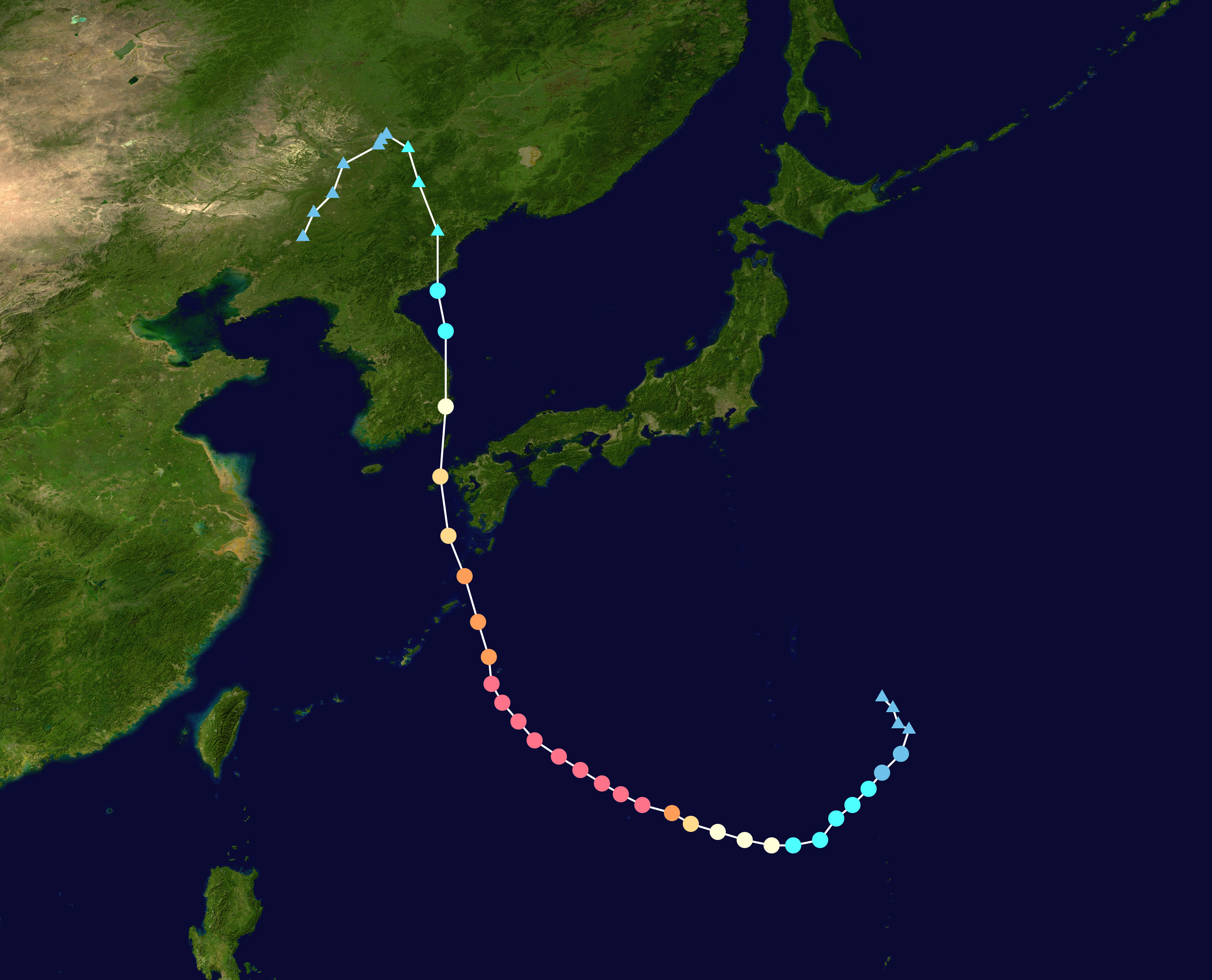
Map plotting the storm's track and intensity, according to the Saffir–Simpson scale Map key Saffir–Simpson scale Tropical depression (≤38 mph, ≤62 km/h) Tropical storm (39–73 mph, 63–118 km/h) Category 1 (74–95 mph, 119–153 km/h) Category 2 (96–110 mph, 154–177 km/h) Category 3 (111–129 mph, 178–208 km/h) Category 4 (130–156 mph, 209–251 km/h) Category 5 (≥157 mph, ≥252 km/h) Unknown Storm type Tropical cyclone Subtropical cyclone Extratropical cyclone, remnant low, tropical disturbance, or monsoon depression

On August 29, the JTWC began tracking a very disorganized tropical disturbance situated a couple hundred miles northeast of Guam. By the next day, the disturbance had quickly organized, and the JTWC issued a Tropical Cyclone Formation Alert (TCFA) for the low-pressure area. By the next day, it intensified into Tropical Depression 11W. Traversing generally south-westward, the depression quickly intensified into a tropical storm. The JMA soon followed and upgraded the system into a tropical storm as well, and was given the international name Haishen. (Note: The name Haishen (Mandarin: 海神, [xaɪ˧˩˧ ʂən˧˥]) was contributed by China and literally means "god of sea" in Mandarin.) Later that day, Haishen became a severe tropical storm as it headed southwest into the Philippine Sea. Intensification on September 3 was significant - with Typhoon Haishen acquiring a pinhole eye early in the day, but it later underwent an eyewall replacement cycle. The cycle completed quickly, however, and strengthening resumed almost immediately. Then, the JTWC noted the possibility of Haishen becoming a Category 5 super typhoon in one of their advisories.

Entering the Philippine Area of Responsibility (PAR), the Philippine Atmospheric, Geological and Atmospheric Services Administration (PAGASA) named the system Kristine. Early on September 4, the JTWC assessed that Haishen became a Category 4-equivalent super typhoon - with 1-minute sustained wind speeds of 135 kn (155 mph; 250 km/h), with a clear, symmetrical eye visible on satellite imagery. On September 5, as Haishen's latitude increased, the ocean heat content in the area decreased, which disrupted the system's core and caused its eye to appear ragged on satellite imagery, subsequently indicating weakening, and dropping below super typhoon status.

Later that day, the system left the PAR and PAGASA issued its last bulletin on the typhoon. As the system continued its northward track toward the Japanese archipelago, it continued to weaken and became a category 3 typhoon as Haishen made another eyewall replacement cycle, and not too long after it dropped to a category 2 typhoon as it neared the Southern Ryukyu Islands of Japan. A mandatory evacuation order was issued for western Japan as millions of people evacuated accordingly. Haishen made landfall in Ulsan, South Korea at around 09:00 KST (00:00 UTC) on September 7, with 10-minute maximum sustained winds at 140 km/h (85 mph) and the central pressure at 955 hPa (28.20 inHg). Shortly after, Haishen entered the Sea of Japan as a high-end tropical storm; due to the low-sea surface temperatures, Haishen quickly weakened and made landfall in the South Hamgyong Province, North Korea with 10-minute maximum sustained winds of 100 km/h (60 mph) and a central pressure of 980 hPa (28.94 inHg). Soon afterwards, JTWC issued its final warning on Haishen, as it moved further inland into North Korea. At 18:50 UTC, JMA issued its last advisory on Haishen, and declared it an extratropical low as it moved near the China–North Korea border.

== Preparations ==
=== Japan ===
Officials ordered people to evacuate from dangerous areas near the coast and follow orders by local governments. According to Japanese public broadcaster NHK., 246, 251 people in Kagoshima and 36,392 in Nagasaki were evacuated. More than 580 domestic flights and bullet trains were cancelled to southern Kyushu and Okinawa. Authorities issued emergency warnings and stated that residents were urged to prepare for evacuation.

=== South Korea ===
The Korea Meteorological Administration has issued a preliminary typhoon warning for all South Korean provinces as well as a heavy rain warning for northern Gangwon Province. Over 340 flights and 114 shipping routes, in addition to several national train services, were cancelled.

=== North Korea ===
Residents in coastal Kangwon Province were evacuated and flood warnings were issued ahead of the storm.

== Impact ==
At least four casualties were reported, with two in Japan and another two in South Korea. The storm caused flood and wind-related damage and major power outages. Around 10,000 houses were damaged, destroyed or flooded in storm-related incidents. Total combined economic losses are anticipated to surpass US$100 million.

=== Japan ===
Typhoon Haishen bringing strong winds to Japan

Haishen brought strong winds and high waves to parts of Japan. At least two people were killed and over 100 were injured. A mudslide in Miyazaki Prefecture left four people missing. Agricultural damage across the nation were at JP¥14.93 billion (US$140 million). The Kyushu Electric Power Co stated at least 107,540 households were still without power across the Kyushu region as of September 7, 2020. Moreover, more than 200,000 households were out of power in Kagoshima and 3,930 households in Okinawa. As of being in the path of Haishen, the Japanese Coast Guard was forced to temporarily suspend their search and rescue mission for missing crew members of the cargo ship, Gulf Livestock 1, which sank a week before as of the effects of Typhoon Maysak.

=== South Korea ===
As if the Korean Peninsula was not already devastated by Typhoon Maysak which made landfall less than a week earlier, Haishen made landfall in the city of Ulsan, early September 7 local time. Flooding rains and strong winds from Haishen displaced 3,100 people and left at least 75,000 households without power. Two people were killed and five were injured; two others went missing. Two nuclear power plants in Gyeongju automatically stopped during the typhoon for yet unknown reasons. Rains up to 150 mm (5.9 in) were common for coastal areas along the eastern portion of the peninsula, while 75 mm (3.0 in) rain was recorded in the western areas. Transportation was disrupted as of the extremely flooded roads. According to The Korea Herald, power cuts and severe tree damage was expected in the area. Due to the severe power cut, work was immediately shut down the Hyundai Motors factory in Ulsan. In Busan, a city with a population of 3.4 million, traffic lights collapsed, signboards were ripped off and roads shut down due to strong winds and heavy rain. Total damage along with Typhoon Maysak were calculated at ₩606.3 billion (US$510 million).

=== North Korea ===
Widespread flooding occurred in the country. Military personnel were dispatched to assist in rebuilding houses. Roughly 300,000 members of the Workers' Party of Korea involved themselves in reconstruction projects.

=== China ===
The extratropical remnants of Haishen entered Northeast China, causing flooding to the region. The total damage in the region, along with Bavi and Maysak, reached CN¥12.8 billion (US$1.87 billion).

== See also ==
- Weather of 2020
- Tropical cyclones in 2020
- Other typhoons named Haishen
- Typhoon Rusa (2002) – also affected South Korea.
- Typhoon Maemi (2003) – a powerful storm that also struck South Korea.
- Typhoon Sanba (2012) – another significant storm that struck the Korean Peninsula.
- Typhoon Hinnamnor (2022) – another powerful typhoon that made landfall in South Korea.
- Typhoon Nanmadol (2022) – an intense typhoon that had a similar path and same intensity.
