= Don Carlos (disambiguation) =

Don Carlos is an opera by Giuseppe Verdi, also known as Don Carlo.

Don Carlos or Don Carlo may also refer to:

== People ==
=== Titled "Don" named "Carlos" ===
- Don Carlos, Prince of Asturias (1545–1568), heir-apparent to the throne of Spain
- Charles "Don Carlos" Percy (1704–1794), founder of the Percy family of Louisiana, Alabama and Mississippi
- Charles III of Spain or Don Carlos (1716–1788)
- Don Carlos, Count of Molina (1788–1855), son of King Charles IV of Spain and a Carlist claimant to the throne of Spain as Carlos V
- Don Carlos, Duke of Madrid (1848–1909), senior member of the House of Bourbon and a Carlist claimant to the throne of Spain as Carlos VII
- Don Carlos, Prince of Bourbon-Two Sicilies (1870–1949), nephew of the last King of the Two Sicilies, Francis II
- Carlo Gambino or Don Carlo (1902–1976), mafioso and boss of the Gambino crime family

=== Given name "Don" surname "Carlos" ===
- Don Carlos (basketball) (born 1944), American basketball player
- Don Carlos (musician) (born 1952), Jamaican reggae singer

=== Given name "Don Carlos" ===
- Don Allado or Don Carlos Allado (born 1977), Filipino former basketball player
- Don Carlos Buell (1818–1898), US Army officer
- Don Carlos Harvey (1911–1963), American television and film actor
- Don Carlos Seitz (1862–1935), American newspaper manager
- Don Carlos Smith (1816–1841), brother of Latter Day Saint leader Joseph Smith, Jr.
- Don Carlos Travis Jr. (1911–1996), American professor
- Don Carlos Young (1855–1938), American architect for the Church of Jesus Christ of Latter-day Saints

=== Fictional characters ===
- Don Carlos (Miracle Giants Dome-kun), a character from Miracle Giants Dome-kun anime

== Other uses ==
- Don Carlos (play), a historical tragedy by Friedrich Schiller
- Don Carlos, Bukidnon, a Philippine municipality
- MV Don Carlos, a ship

== See also ==
- Carlos I of Portugal (1863–1908), King of Portugal, known as Dom Carlos
- Carlos Arias Navarro (1908–1989), Spanish politician during the reign of Generalissimo Francisco Franco
- Infante Carlos, Duke of Calabria (1938–2015), claimant to the headship of House of Bourbon-Two Sicilies
- Prince Carlos, Duke of Parma (born 1970), current head of the House of Bourbon-Parma and Carlist claimant to the throne of Spain as Carlos Javier I
- Don Carlo Gesualdo (1566–1613), Italian music composer, murderer
- Carlos Hugo, Duke of Parma (1930–2010), head of the House of Bourbon-Parma and Carlist claimant to the throne of Spain as Carlos Hugo I
- Carlos Martínez de Irujo, 1st Marquis of Casa Irujo (1763–1824), Spanish diplomat and public official
- Carlos Miguel Fitz-James Stuart, 14th Duke of Alba (1794–1835), Spanish aristocrat
- Carlos Ometochtzin (died 1539), member of the Acolhua nobility and known for his resistance to Christian evangelization
- Cathal O'Connor Faly (c. 1540–1596), Irish rebel who became known as "Don Carlos" during his time in the Spanish Armada
- Don Carlos of Spain (disambiguation)
- Don (disambiguation)
- Carlos (disambiguation)
