= MV Don Carlos =

A number of ships have been named Don Carlos.

- MV Don Carlos (1975), Finnish car carrier
- MV Don Carlos, formerly New Zealand sealift ship HMNZS Charles Upham, operated by Spanish company Contenemar SA between 1998 and 2009
- CMA CGM Done Carlos, 2006 post Panamax containership operated by CMA CGM

== See also ==
- Don Carlos (disambiguation)
