= Typhoon Bavi (2020) =

Pacific typhoon in 2020

Typhoon Bavi (Igme)
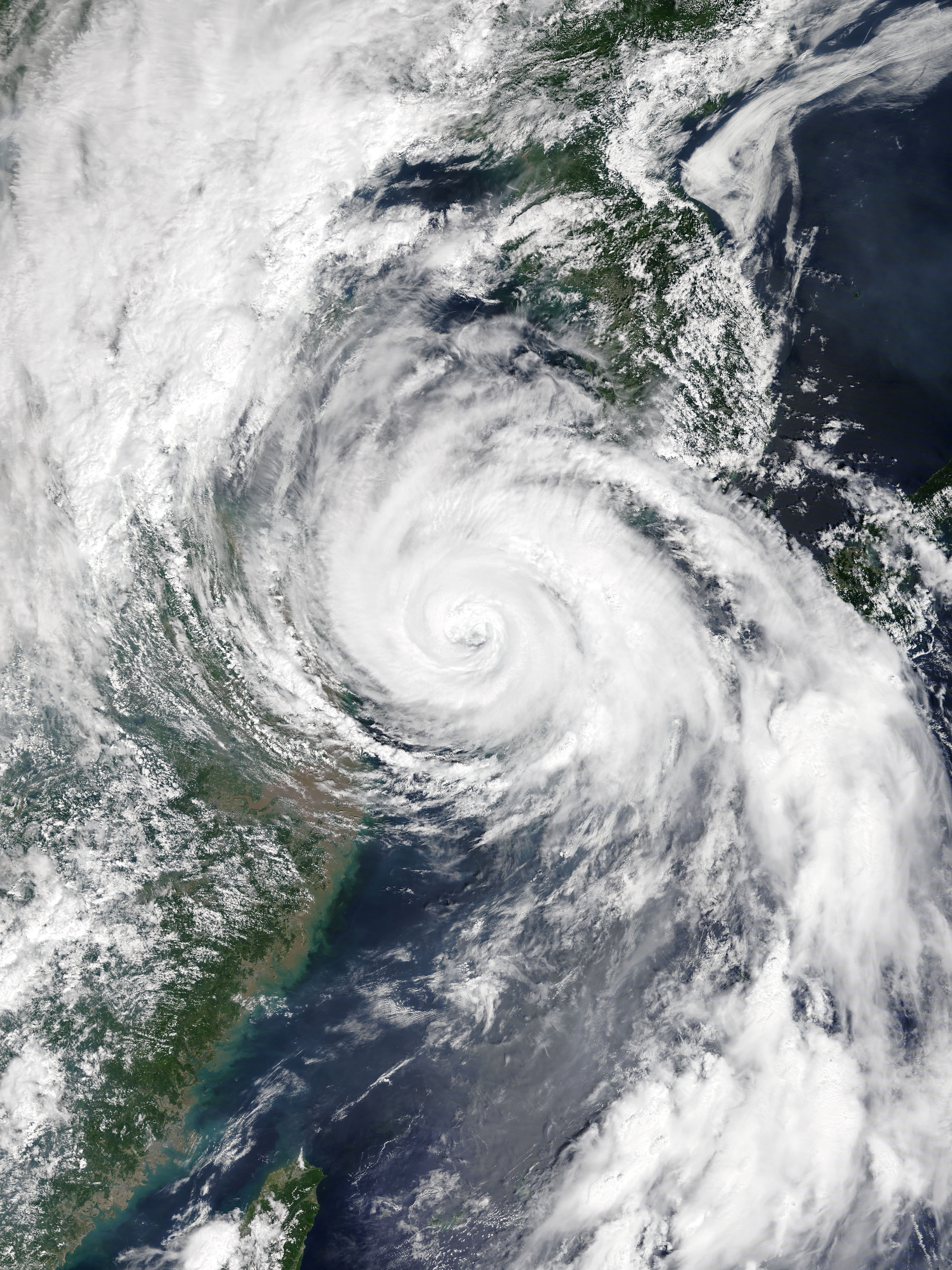
- Bavi at peak intensity near Jeju Island on August 26

Meteorological history
- Formed: August 20, 2020
- Extratropical: August 27, 2020
- Dissipated: August 30, 2020

Very strong typhoon
- 10-minute sustained (JMA)
- Highest winds: 155 km/h (100 mph)
- Lowest pressure: 950 hPa (mbar); 28.05 inHg

Category 3-equivalent typhoon
- 1-minute sustained (SSHWS/JTWC)
- Highest winds: 185 km/h (115 mph)
- Lowest pressure: 942 hPa (mbar); 27.82 inHg

Overall effects
- Fatalities: 1 total
- Damage: $11.7 million (2020 USD)
- Areas affected: Philippines, Ryukyu Islands, Taiwan, Korean Peninsula, North China, Northeast China
- IBTrACS
- Part of the 2020 Pacific typhoon season

Typhoon Bavi, (Note: The name Bavi (Vietnamese: Ba Vì, [ʔɓaː˧˧ vi˨˩]) was contributed by Vietnam and refers to the Ba Vì mountain range in Vietnamese.) known in the Philippines as Severe Tropical Storm Igme, was a powerful tropical cyclone that made landfall in North Korea in late August 2020. The eighth named storm and third typhoon of the 2020 Pacific typhoon season, Bavi formed from a low pressure area depression on August 21 to the north of the Philippines and strengthened into a tropical storm on August 22. Bavi gradually strengthened as it skirted Taiwan and Okinawa, and became a typhoon on August 24. Passing over warm waters, Bavi turned to northwest and reached its peak intensity near Jeju Island on August 26. Thereafter, increasing wind shear and cooler waters caused Bavi to quickly weaken. Bavi made landfall in North Korea on August 27, and became an extratropical cyclone shortly thereafter.

Bavi caused minimal damage in portions of South Korea and Japan, but caused widespread structural damage and flooding in North Korea. It was the first storm in two weeks span to affect Korea. Others were Maysak and Haishen.

== Meteorological history ==
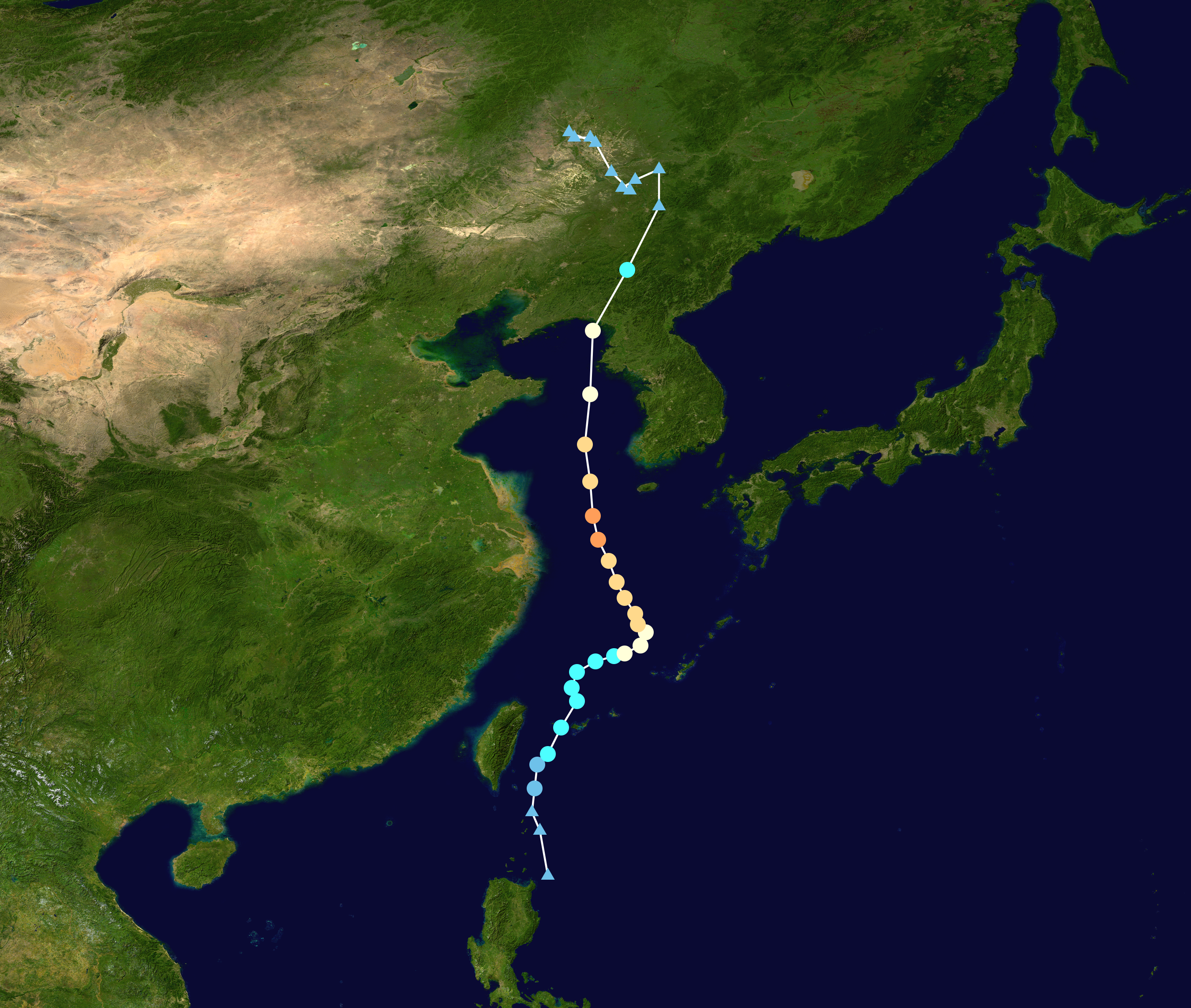
Map plotting the storm's track and intensity, according to the Saffir–Simpson scale Map key Saffir–Simpson scale Tropical depression (≤38 mph, ≤62 km/h) Tropical storm (39–73 mph, 63–118 km/h) Category 1 (74–95 mph, 119–153 km/h) Category 2 (96–110 mph, 154–177 km/h) Category 3 (111–129 mph, 178–208 km/h) Category 4 (130–156 mph, 209–251 km/h) Category 5 (≥157 mph, ≥252 km/h) Unknown Storm type Tropical cyclone Subtropical cyclone Extratropical cyclone, remnant low, tropical disturbance, or monsoon depression

On August 19, the JTWC began monitoring a broad area of low pressure situated a couple hundred miles northeast of the Philippine archipelago. By the next day, the system rapidly organised, and the JTWC subsequently issued a Tropical Cyclone Formation Alert (TCFA), and on August 21, the area of low pressure organized into Tropical Depression 09W. At 15:00 UTC, the PAGASA named the system "Igme" and issued a severe weather bulletin for it. By the next day the system had intensified into a tropical storm, and the JMA gave it the name Bavi and upgraded it, with the JTWC doing the same. Favorable conditions allowed Bavi to rapidly intensify, and by 12:00 UTC on August 22, the system became a severe tropical storm. The system left the Philippine Area of Responsibility on the same day. Bavi's period of rapid intensification was brief, with its intensification significantly slowed on August 23.

On August 24, Bavi was upgraded into a typhoon by the JTWC as it continued to slowly intensify. Later on that day, it became a Category 2 typhoon, with it becoming a Category 3 typhoon on the next day. As Bavi moved closer to the Korean peninsula, one person died in Jeju Island on August 25. Soon afterwards, as Bavi moved northwards into very hostile conditions and high wind shear, which caused Bavi to rapidly weaken. Wind shear was still high and the storm started extratropical transition. Around 00:30 UTC on August 27, a weakened Bavi made landfall over North Pyongan Province, North Korea as a minimal typhoon. Both the JMA and the JTWC issued their final advisory on Bavi a few hours later as it became an extratropical cyclone over Northeastern China.

== Preparations, impact, and aftermath ==
=== Japan ===
Bavi caused wind gusts of over 60 mph (97 km/h) and dropped 300 mm (12 in) of rain on the island of Okinawa. Agricultural damage in Okinawa Prefecture was JP¥25.14 million (US$237 thousand). Large waves associated with Bavi were reported as far away as Kagoshima Prefecture.

=== South Korea ===
In South Korea, as a precaution over 470 flights were cancelled and railroad services were halted. Public parks were also closed for the typhoon.

In Jeju Island, five people were swept away by strong waves, one of them died later. Heavy rainfall was also reported in the island with a maximum amount of 399.5 mm (15.73 in) being reported near Mount Halla. Despite a close pass to mainland South Korea, damage was minimal, consisting mostly of power outages, broken windows, and downed trees. Nevertheless, more than 100 reports of damage was submitted. The typhoon forced about 30 people in Gokseong, South Jeolla Province, to evacuate due to landslides. About 440 flights were cancelled at eleven airports across the country, while nearly 160 passenger ferries were grounded on 99 ferry routes. Roughly 1,600 households in South Korea lost power. Losses in Jeju reached ₩484 million (US$408 thousand).

=== North Korea ===
Infrared animation of Typhoon Bavi making landfall in North Korea

North Korean leader Kim Jong Un held a high-level political conference where he voiced his concerns about Typhoon Bavi and the COVID-19 pandemic. He ordered all levels of the Workers' Party to take steps to protect the country from the threat of the storm.

Snapped utility poles and trees were reported near Bavi's landfall location, as well as flooded roads. A peak precipitation amount of 224 mm (8.8 in) was reported in Anju. Several homes and public buildings were damaged in North and South Hwanghae provinces.

Korean Central Television remained on the air overnight on 27 August as the typhoon impacted the country, interrupting programs every 30 minutes with updates from the State Hydro-Meteorological Administration. It later broadcast live field reports from correspondents in Pyongyang and Nampo to cover its landfall and damage. This coverage was a major divergence from the strict, propaganda-based format and content of all other KCTV news programming, where the activities of Kim Jong Un take precedence. No other coverage of the storm was included in KCTV bulletins until 28 August, when a story followed Kim as he inspected damage from the storm.

=== China ===
Several weather alerts were issued for portions of China as Typhoon Bavi neared. The Chinese Ministry of Emergency Management stated that 20,000 firefighters had been deployed equipped with 329 rescue boats.

In Northeast China, rounds of heavy downpours brought up to 150 mm (5.9 in) of rainfall in some areas. Damage in Dalian amounted to be CN¥76.54 million (US$11.1 million).

== See also ==
- Weather of 2020
- Tropical cyclones in 2020
- Typhoon Prapiroon (2000) – Had a similar track.
- Typhoon Kompasu (2010) – Affected the South Korean capital, Seoul.
- Typhoon Bolaven (2012) – Another typhoon that made landfall as a tropical storm in North Korea.
- Typhoon Lingling (2019) – Previous typhoon to hit North Korea prior to Bavi.
- Typhoon Maysak (2020) – A storm that struck South Korea a week later.
- Typhoon Haishen (2020) – A storm that struck the Korean Peninsula after Bavi and Maysak.
- Typhoon Khanun (2023) – A typhoon that also stalled in the Okinawa Islands before making it to the Korean Peninsula.
