= Typhoon Lingling (2019) =

Pacific typhoon in 2019

Typhoon Lingling (Liwayway)
- Typhoon Lingling at peak intensity off the coast of China on 5 September

Meteorological history
- Formed: 31 August 2019
- Extratropical: 7 September 2019
- Dissipated: 8 September 2019

Very strong typhoon
- 10-minute sustained (JMA)
- Highest winds: 175 km/h (110 mph)
- Lowest pressure: 940 hPa (mbar); 27.76 inHg

Category 4-equivalent typhoon
- 1-minute sustained (SSHWS/JTWC)
- Highest winds: 220 km/h (140 mph)
- Lowest pressure: 928 hPa (mbar); 27.40 inHg

Overall effects
- Fatalities: 8 total
- Damage: $300 million (2019 USD)
- Areas affected: Philippines, Taiwan, China, Japan, North Korea, Russia, Alaska
- IBTrACS
- Part of the 2019 Pacific typhoon season

Typhoon Lingling, also known in the Philippines as Typhoon Liwayway, was a powerful typhoon that hit the Philippines, China, and Korea in early September 2019. It was also the strongest to strike North Korea. Lingling caused agriculture damage to Japan and the Korean Peninsula, causing several million USD in damage. Overall, Lingling caused $300 million (2019 USD) in damage and claimed eight lives.

== Meteorological history ==
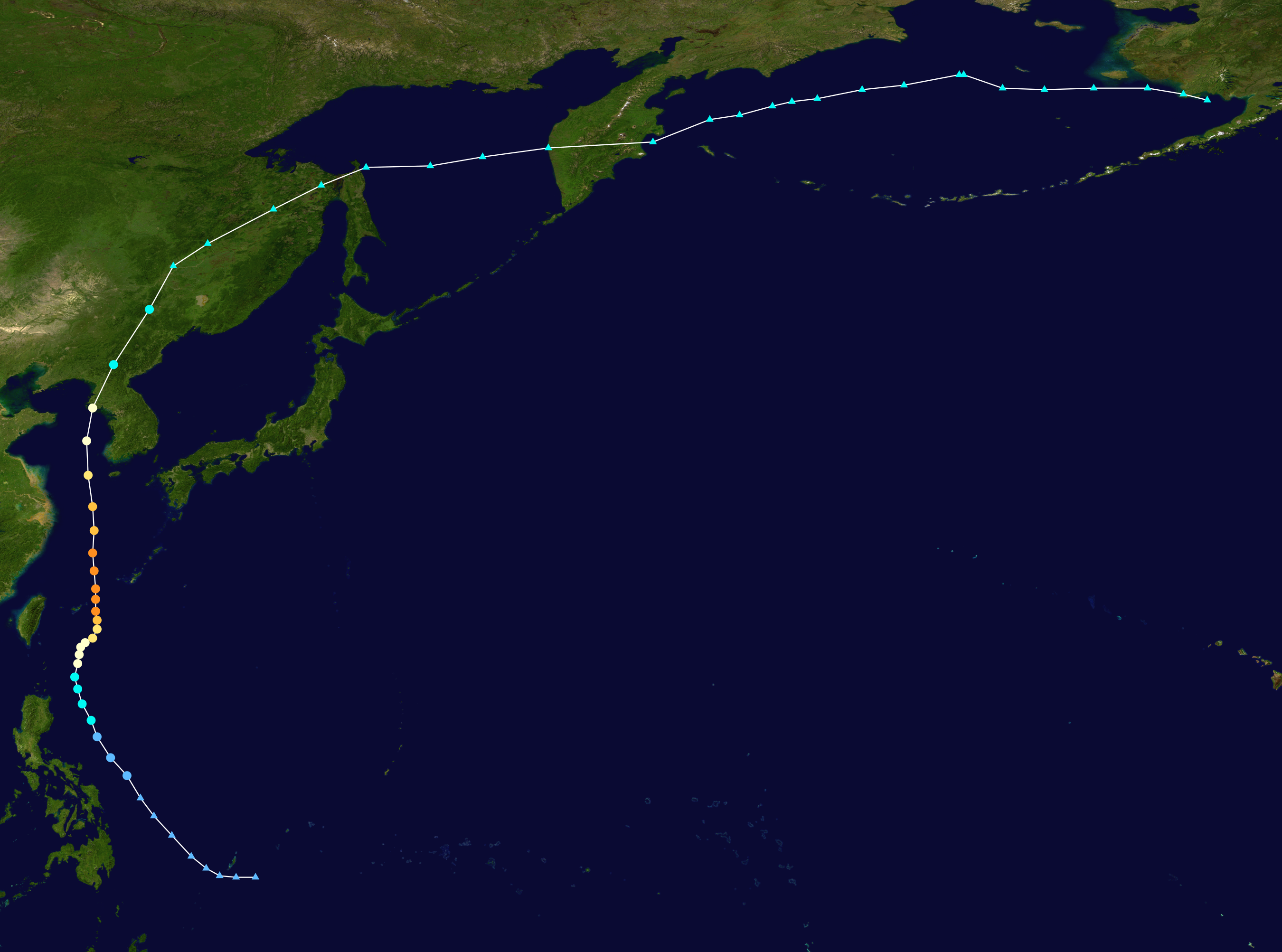
Map plotting the storm's track and intensity, according to the Saffir–Simpson scale Map key Saffir–Simpson scale Tropical depression (≤38 mph, ≤62 km/h) Tropical storm (39–73 mph, 63–118 km/h) Category 1 (74–95 mph, 119–153 km/h) Category 2 (96–110 mph, 154–177 km/h) Category 3 (111–129 mph, 178–208 km/h) Category 4 (130–156 mph, 209–251 km/h) Category 5 (≥157 mph, ≥252 km/h) Unknown Storm type Tropical cyclone Subtropical cyclone Extratropical cyclone, remnant low, tropical disturbance, or monsoon depression

On August 31, three tropical depressions formed, one of which was east of Mindanao. The Joint Typhoon Warning Center then issued a Tropical Cyclone Formation Alert for the system. On September 1, the Philippines agency PAGASA upgraded the system to a tropical depression and named it Liwayway. The Joint Typhoon Warning Center then gave Liwayway the designation 15W. Liwayway then became better organized in the Philippine Sea. Early on September 2, the Japan Meteorological Agency reported that Liwayway intensified into a tropical storm, and named the system Lingling. (Note: The name Lingling (Cantonese: 玲玲, [liŋ˨˩ liŋ˨˩]) was contributed by Hong Kong and is a feminine given nickname meaning "tinkling of a jade" in Cantonese.) Lingling then continued to organize itself, and soon later, the JTWC upgraded Lingling to a tropical storm. Lingling steadily strengthened, with convection consolidating around the center. Early in the morning of September 3, Lingling further intensified into a severe tropical storm. Late on September 3 UTC (early on September 4 local time), Lingling developed an eye. Subsequently, the JTWC upgraded Lingling into a Category 1 typhoon. Early on September 5, the JMA and PAGASA upgraded Lingling into a typhoon. Subsequently, Lingling then underwent rapid intensification from favorable conditions near the South China Sea and soon became a Category 2, and later a Category 4 on the Saffir–Simpson scale, as it tracked east of Taiwan. The eye became clear and wide as Lingling intensified even further. Lingling then moved out of the Philippine Area of Responsibility after making landfall in Miyako Island, and PAGASA issued its final advisory on Lingling. Lingling then made landfall as a Category 4 on Miyako-jima, then continued to intensify, and reaching its peak intensity as a violent typhoon, the first since Lekima a month earlier. It gradually weakened as it was east of China. At 2:30 p.m. KST (05:30 UTC), Lingling made landfall in South Hwanghae Province, North Korea with winds of 130 km/h (80 mph), becoming the first typhoon and the strongest storm to strike the country. On September 8, Lingling weakened to a minimal tropical storm. It moved away from North Korea and the center moved to Russia, weakening even further. Inside Russia, Lingling transitioned into an extratropical cyclone. Extratropical remnants of Lingling would travel through Russia before crossing the International Date Line in September 12.

== Preparations and impacts ==
=== Philippines ===
Lingling enhanced the southwest monsoon, and caused rains in many parts of the country, while floods in other areas had still not subsided from the previous storms that passed the Extreme Northern Luzon area. Passing east of the Philippines, Lingling caused flooding in Luzon. Agricultural damage in Pampanga were amounted to ₱5.65 million (US$108,000).

=== Japan ===
Authorities issued an evacuation advisory before the storm. The advisory was lifted on September 6, after the storm passed. Lingling left more than 20,000 households without power in Okinawa Prefecture. In Miyakojima, Okinawa, 80 percent of homes were affected by a blackout. Economic loss in Okinawa Prefecture were at JP¥533 million (US$4.98 million).

=== Koreas ===
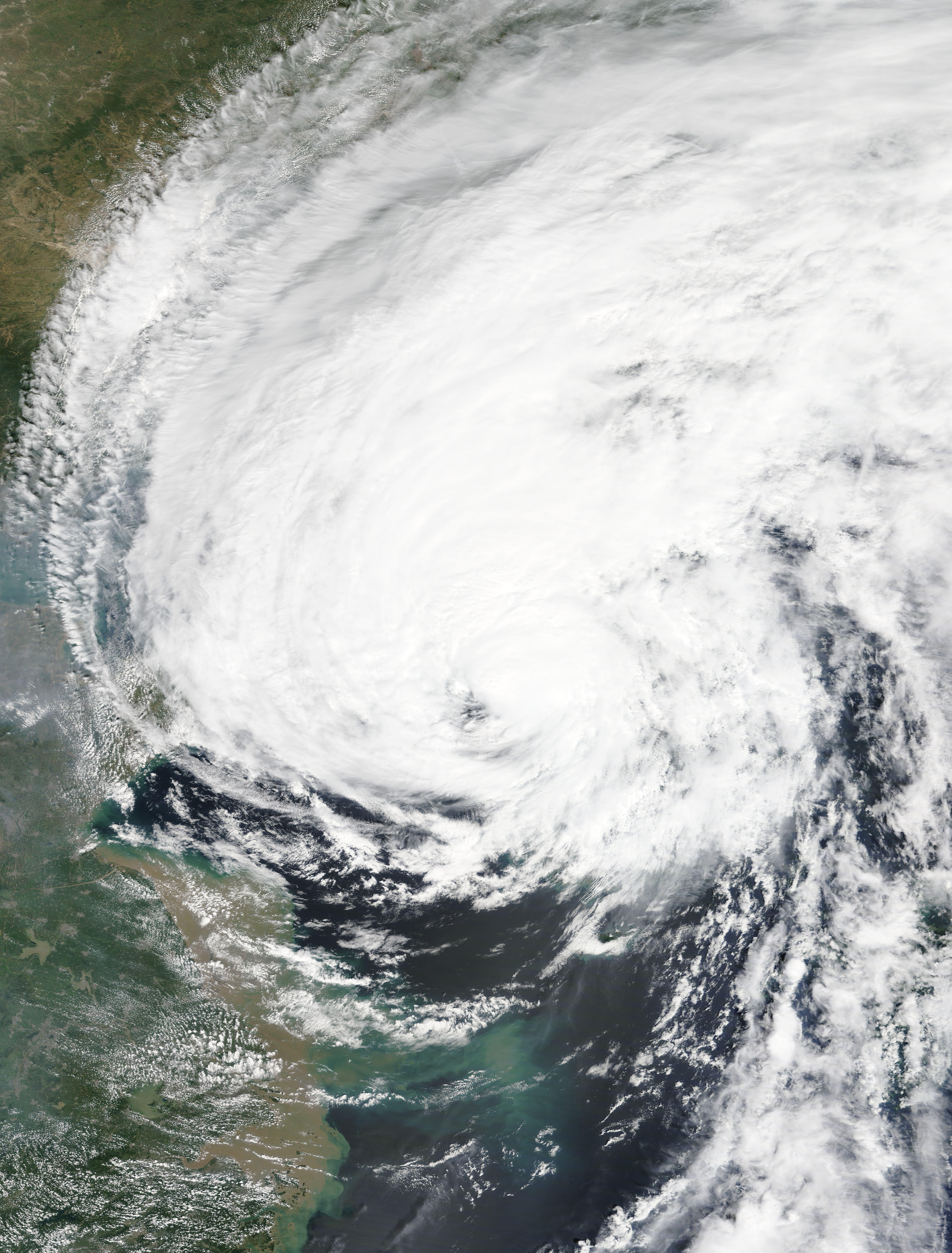
Typhoon Lingling making landfall in South Korea.

Passing west of South Korea, Lingling killed three people and injured ten others. Wind gusts reached 196 km/h (122 mph) in Heuksando, the strongest wind observed in the country since Maemi in 2003. About 161,000 households had experienced power outages. Damage nationwide were amounted to ₩159 billion (US$133 million).

In North Korea, five people were dead with three others injured. The typhoon damaged 475 houses and buildings, as well as 46,200 ha (114,000 acres) of farmland. North Korean leader Kim Jong Un was displeased with the preparations before the typhoon. In a press conference, he said:

[Senior officials were] helpless against the typhoon, unaware of its seriousness and seized with easygoing sentiment.

=== China ===
Lingling also passed through the Northeast China, affecting 455,000 people, according to the Ministry of Emergency Management. Over 2,800 people in the provinces of Jilin, Heilongjiang and Zhejiang were displaced. A total of 44 houses collapsed and over 460 were damaged, while 215,800 hectares of crops were affected. Total damage in China were calculated at CN¥930 million (US$131 million).

=== Russia ===
Later, Lingling's extratropical remnants caused flooding in the Russian Far East, with damage in the Jewish Autonomous Oblast amounting to ₽2 billion (US$30.4 million).

== Aftermath ==
In China, The Ministry of Emergency Management sent work teams to Liaoning, Jilin and Heilongjiang to assist in disaster relief.

== See also ==
- Weather of 2019
- Tropical cyclones in 2019
- Typhoon Bavi (2020)
- Typhoon Maysak (2020) - a storm a year after with a near-identical path
