= Don Carlos of Spain =

Don Carlos of Spain or Infante Carlos of Spain may refer to:

- Charles V, Holy Roman Emperor (1500–1558), also known as Carlos I of Spain, maternal grandson of the Catholic Monarchs King Ferdinand II of Aragon and Queen Isabella of Castile.
- Carlos, Prince of Asturias (1545–1568), eldest son of Philip II of Spain and therefore grandson of the above-mentioned Charles V, Holy Roman Emperor
- Don Carlos, Infante of Spain (1607–1632), second surviving son of Philip III of Spain
- Balthasar Charles, Prince of Asturias (1629–1646), eldest son of Philip IV of Spain
- Charles II of Spain (1661–1700), last Habsburg King of Spain as Carlos II
- Charles III of Spain (1716–1788), King of Spain from 1759 to 1788, formerly Duke of Parma and Piacenza (1731–1735) and King of Naples and Sicily (1734–1759), third surviving son of Philip V of Spain
- Infante Carlos María Isidro of Spain (1788–1855), pretender as Carlos V (the first claimant king of Spanish Carlism) and second surviving son of Charles IV of Spain
- Infante Carlos, Count of Montemolín (1818–1861), Carlist pretender as Carlos VI
- Prince Carlos, Duke of Madrid (1848–1909), Carlist pretender as Carlos VII
- Prince Alfonso Carlos, Duke of Anjou and San Jaime (1849–1936), Carlist pretender as Alfonso Carlos I
- Archduke Karl Pius of Austria, Prince of Tuscany (1909–1953), leader of breakaway Carlist movement between 1943 and 1953 and a disputed pretender as Carlos VIII
- Carlos Hugo, Duke of Parma (1930–2010), former Carlist Prince of Asturias and pretender to the throne of Spain under the name Carlos VIII
- Prince Carlos, Duke of Parma (1970–), former Carlist Prince of Asturias and pretender to the throne of Spain under the name Carlos Javier I

== See also ==
- Don Carlos (disambiguation)
