= Don Carlos Travis =

Don C. Travis Jr.

Personal details
- Born: 13 December 1911 Kenosha, Wisconsin
- Died: March 1, 1996 (aged 84)
- Resting place: Plot Sec 3, Lot 728 of the Oakwood Cemetery (Austin, Texas)
- Spouse: Nevenna Travis (1916 - 2012)
- Children: Neven Don and Andrew David
- Parent: Don Carlos Travis developer of a Self-Tilting Bed (father)
- Education: In June 1929 he graduated from the Mary D. Bradford High School; 1929-33; Princeton University.; Spring semester of 1934 he audited courses in Philosophy at Karl Jaspers and German Literature s:Author:Ewald Augustus Boucke (1871–1943) at the 1934 Sommerschule für Ausländer, Heidelberg University; Winter Semester 1933-1934 Deutsches Institut für Ausländer, Universität Berlin.; 1934-1935 June 1936: Bachelor of Arts magna cum laude in modern languages
- Alma mater: 1936-1937 Master of Arts, German, University of Wisconsin–Madison.; 1937-1941 German and Art History, University of Wisconsin–Madison.; 1959 PhD, German studies, University of Wisconsin–Madison, Dissertation: The Pattern of Reconciliation in the Works of Stefan Andres.

Don Carlos Travis Jr. (1911-1996) was an American Associate professor of German studies at the University of Texas at Austin.

== Government Service ==
- From 1942 to 1943 he was employed in the Office of Censorship in San Antonio.
- From 1943 to 1945 he was employed in the Office of Censorship in Washington DC where he became Section Chief, Office of Director.
- From 1945 to 1947 he was sent on the mission to Germany and Austria of the Library of Congress and became head of the mission.
- In the fall of 1945, some 100 cases of the collection of Friedrich Rehse were removed from the Munich Residenz and the Bürgerbräukeller and stored in the Munich Central Collecting Point. Hans Beilhack visited the Munich Collection Point with Rehse, who complained about the loss of his life's work, his innocence, and the removal of the collection. Travis claimed the Library of Congress's right to confiscate Nazi Party material.
- From 1947 to 1950 he was employed form the Office of Military Government, United States for Germany
- From 1947-50 he was deployed at the Information Services Publications in Munich where he became Chief of Station.
- From 1950 to 1952 he was deployed at the Information Services in Berlin, where he became Chief Information Officer.
- From 1952 to 1954 he served the Rundfunk im amerikanischen Sektor and became Program director.
- From 1954 to 1983 he taught at the University of Texas at Austin.
- He specialized in eighteenth and nineteenth century German artistic and cultural history.
- He carried out research on the cultural and political background of the Nazi Party.
- In 1983 he was retired.

== Publications ==
- Editor, with introduction. A Hegel Symposium. Austin: U. of Texas, 1962; introduction, pp. 3–7
- German Graphics of the Sixties: Catalogue of the Exhibition, February -March 1971, UT Art Museum (translated Introduction by Juliane Roh and compiled short biographies of the artists)
- Reconciliation in the Work of Stefan Andres. Studies in Literature and Language, III, 2 (Summer 1961): 243-250
- Texas Symposium: The German Language in America, Die Unterrichtspraxis II, 104-112 Wilhelm Grose
- In 1980 he edited: Stefan Andres: Ein Reader zu Person und Werk. Trier: Spee-Verlag, includes Die Rache der Schmetterlinge pp. 144–159 (trans. by Frau Alma Zens from 1959 U. Wisconsin dissertation)

== Translations ==
- Karl Jaspers, Truth and Science, (Wahrheit und Wissenschaft) Graduate Journal, V, 1 (Spring 1962): 24-42
- Rainer Maria Rilke, Buddhahood and Tod des Dichters, Modern European Poetry. New York:Bantam Books, 1966: 116 & 125
- Günter Herburger, Where Ancestors Lived, Dimension II, 2 (1968): 226-245
- Uwe Brandner, On the Eleventh Day: A Prose Song, Dimension II, 2 (1968): 324-333
- Oskar Sandner, The Serpentine is Sensual, and other poems, Dimension 8 (1975):314-319
- Oskar Sandner, Life is Hard in the Mountains Dimension 8 (1975): 320-327
