= Hans Beilhack =

German librarian

Personal details
- Born: 18 February 1897 Munich
- Died: 1 January 1970 (aged 72)

Hans Beilhack (18 February 1897 — 1 January 1970) was a German librarian. On November 10, 1916, Franz Kafka read In the Penal Colony at Hans Goltz's Kunstsalon in Munich. Two days later, a recension of Beilhack was published in the Münchner Zeitung. In 1936, due to a satirical contribution published in Der Querschnitt, the Nazi regime prohibited Beilhack from writing. In 1945, he became a literature consultant to the Library of Congress Mission to Europe.

== Works ==
- 1934: Michael August Schichtl In Der Querschnitt
- 1935: Aus dem Irrgarten der Bibliographie; In: Börsenblatt für den deutschen Buchhandel Bd. 102.
- 6 June 1935: Berufsständische Probleme des 17. und 18.Jahrhundert, Die Kunstkammer / Illustrierte Monatszeitschrift mit amtlichen Mitteilungen
- 1936: Attisches Salz. Witz und Bosheit im Altertum
- 1936: Bibliotherapie. Bücher als Medizin. In: Deutsche Medizinische Wochenschrift.
- 1936: Antonio Magliabechi,
- 18 January 1938: Der Mann, der das Gesicht Münchens veränderte, in: Münchner Zeitung Nr. 18 vom 18.1.1938, S. 125
- 9 November 1946: The Library of a Dilettante, A Glimpse into the Private Library of Herr Hitler in Süddeutsche Zeitung,
- Künstler über Künstler
- 1948: Die Frau im Spiegel der Satire
- 1948: Schiller als Arzt
- 1948: Verrückte Literaturgeschichte
- 20 April 1956: München und Umbebung Reiseführer Oberbayern II Uberarbeitung, durchgeführt von Hans Beilhack. Grieben
