= MV Danny F II =

20th-century cargo ship

- Don Carlos

- Danny F II

History
- Name: Don Carlos (1975–94); Danny F II (1994–2009)
- Owner: Rederei AB Soya (1976–85); Wallenius Lines Singapore Ptd Ltd (1985–94); Rachid Fares Enterprise Proprietary (1994–2009)
- Operator: Rederei AB Soya (1976–85); Wallenius Lines (1985–94); Rachid Fares Enterprise Proprietary (1994–2000); Danny F II (2000–05); Falcon Point Intl Co. (2005–09)
- Port of registry: (Sweden) Stockholm (1976–85); Singapore (1985–95); Liberia (1995–2000); Saint Vincent and the Grenadines (2000–05); Panama (2005–09)
- Builder: Oy Wärtsilä Ab Turku shipyard
- Yard number: 1220
- Launched: 14 November 1975
- Completed: April 1976
- In service: 30 April 1976
- Out of service: 17 December 2009
- Identification: IMO number: 7359462; Callsign J8KU6 (Don Carlos); Callsign 3EDI3 (Danny F II); MMSI number: 371575000
- Fate: Capsized and sank 17 December 2009

General characteristics
- Tonnage: 14,478 GT; 7,258 NT; 14,800 DWT
- Length: 202.62 m (664 ft 9 in)
- Beam: 28.15 m (92 ft 4 in)
- Draught: 8.48 m (27 ft 10 in)
- Installed power: 1 × Sulzer 6RND 90 diesel engine
- Speed: 20 knots (37 km/h)
- Capacity: 5,000 cars (1976–85)
- Crew: 77

Danny F II (originally Don Carlos) was a cargo ship built in 1975 as a car carrier. She was renamed Danny F II when rebuilt as a livestock transporter in 1994. The ship capsized and sank off Lebanon on 17 December 2009, carrying 83 people, 10,224 sheep, and 17,932 cattle. 40 people were rescued and 11 found dead. The other crew, passengers and animals are presumed to have died.

== Construction ==
Don Carlos was built by Oy Wärtsilä Ab Turku shipyard, Finland, as yard number 1220. She was launched on 14 November 1975, and completed in April 1976. She was 202.62 metres (664 ft 9 in) long, with a beam of 28.15 metres (92 ft 4 in) and a draught of 8.48 metres (27 ft 10 in). The ship was 14,478 GT, 7,258 NT and 14,800 DWT. Her Sulzer 6RND 90 diesel engine gave her a top speed of 20 knots (37 km/h).

== History ==
Don Carlos was built for Rederei AB Soya, Stockholm. Originally a car carrier, she was delivered on 30 April 1976. In October 1985, Don Carlos was transferred to Wallenius Lines Singapore Ptd Ltd, Singapore. In July 1994, she was sold to BSA Transportation Pte, Ltd. of Singapore and renamed Danny F II.

Danny F II arrived at Singapore on 15 August 1994, for rebuilding as a livestock transporter. The work was carried out by Pan United Shipyards. She was sold in 1995 to Rachid Fares Enterprise Proprietary, Fremantle, and reflagged to Liberia. On 25 April 2000, she was registered to Danny F II, St Vincent and the Grenadines. On 16 September 2000, Danny F II rescued the 25 crew of Madona some 200 nautical miles (370 km) north of the Cocos Islands. Madona had developed a severe list after her cargo shifted. On 24 October 2005, Danny F II was registered to Falcon Point International, Panama.

In 2005, it was reported that Danny F II had been detained at Adelaide because of defects which included holed bulkheads, defective navigation lights and radio equipment and defective watertight doors.

== Sinking ==
On 17 December 2009, Danny F II capsized and sank in bad weather in the Mediterranean Sea, 11 nautical miles (20 km) from Tripoli, Lebanon, (not to be confused with the Libyan city of the same name), while sailing from Montevideo, Uruguay, to Tartus, Syria, carrying six passengers, 77 crew, 10,224 sheep and 17,932 head of cattle. The ship's British captain, John M Milloy, is reported to have remained on board when the ship rolled over in the high seas.

After a distress call made at 15:55 local time (13:55 UTC), a rescue effort was launched comprising ships from the United Nations Interim Force in Lebanon (UNIFIL) CTF 448 under the command of Italian Navy rear admiral, Francesco Sandalli, onboard the Italian frigate Zeffiro. Among the rescuers were two German Navy ships, as part of the CTF 448, and small rescue boats from Lebanese Armed Forces (LAF). A Bell Griffin HAR2 helicopter from 84 Squadron, Royal Air Force, based at RAF Akrotiri and Cyprus Police Aviation Unit helicopters (Bell 412s) following a request from the rescue coordination centre in Larnaca were dispatched to assist in the rescue.

Rescue efforts were hampered by poor weather conditions, high waves and floating carcasses from the ship's livestock cargo. Rescue operations stopped after 72 hours later with 40 men rescued, 11 found dead and 32 men remained missing and presumed dead. All the livestock were presumed dead.
