= Livestock carrier =

Large ship for transporting livestock

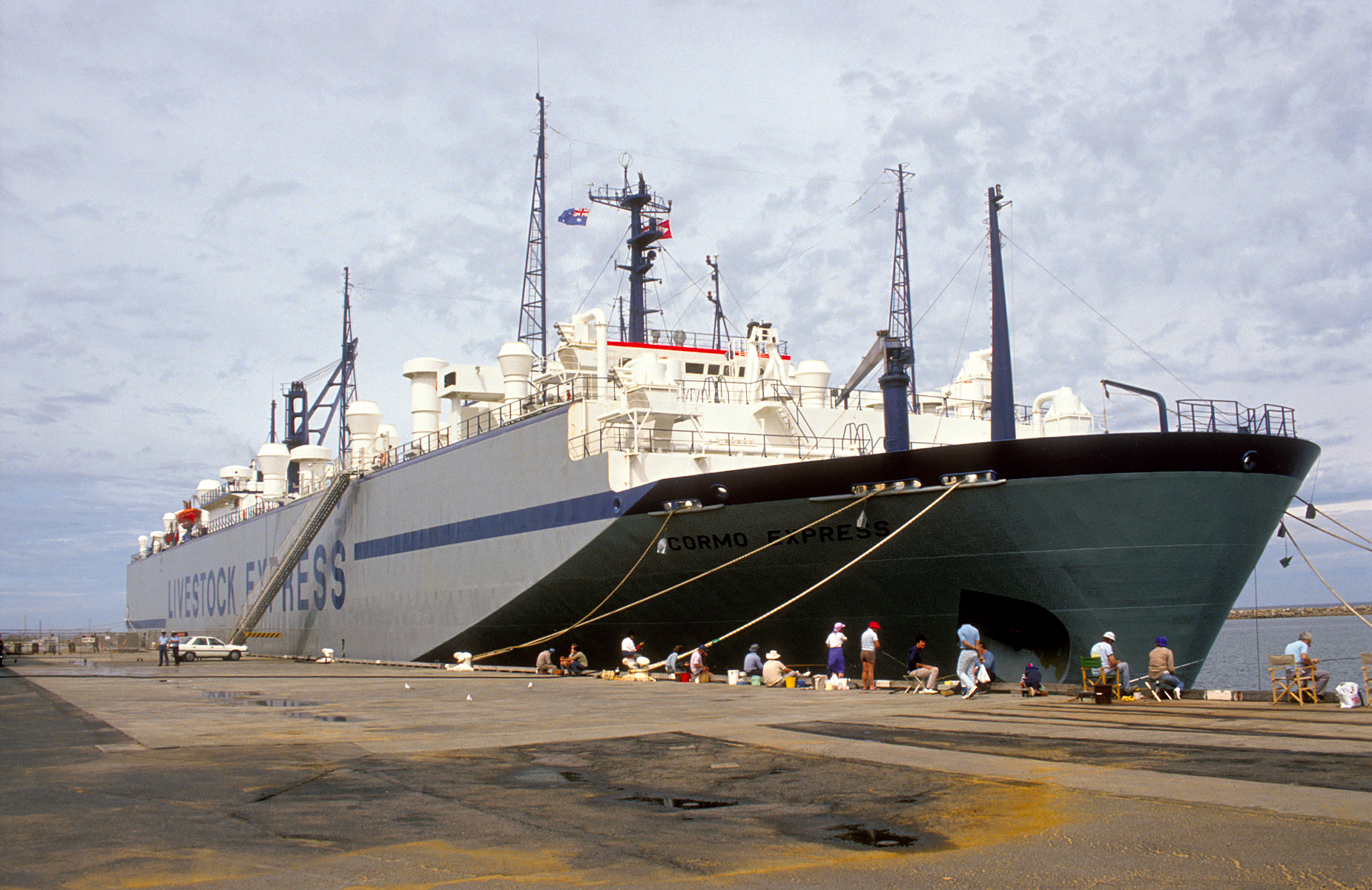
Livestock Carrier-ship

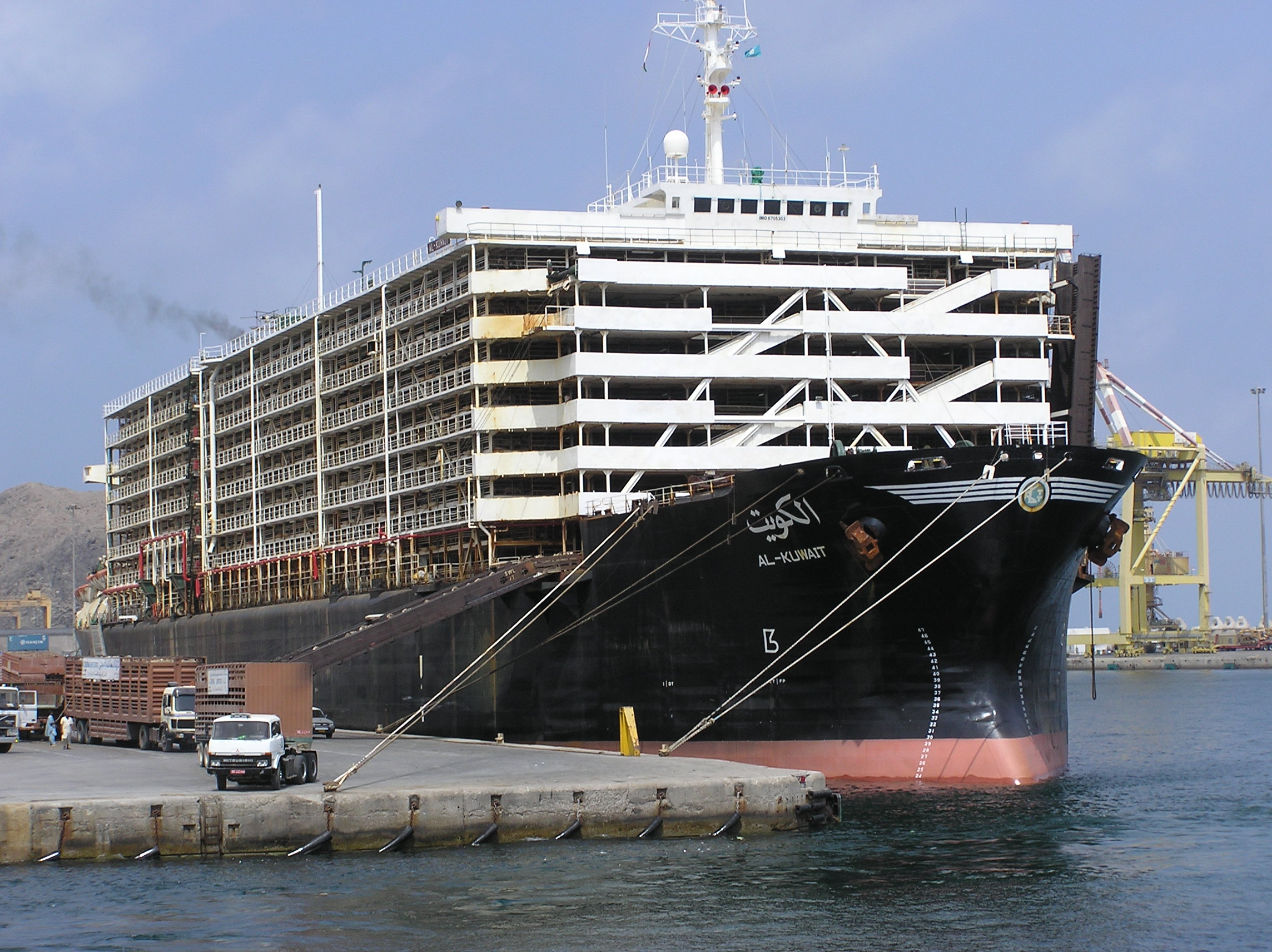
An open livestock carrier with a cargo of sheep from Australia, docked in Oman

A livestock carrier is a seagoing vessel for the transportation of live animals. Typically it is large ship used in the live export of sheep, cattle and goats. Livestock carriers may be specially built new or converted from container ships.

Their use is controversial, primarily due to effects on farm animals alongside disease risks. Animal welfare and animal rights groups have criticized livestock carriers and many call for a ban.

== Livestock carriers ==
Livestock carriers are those ships which specialise exclusively in the transportation of large numbers of live animals together with their requirements for the voyage. (food, water, sawdust bedding, medication, etc.).

Voyages on livestock carriers generally last from three days to three or four weeks. Some have lasted for periods of months when disease outbreaks are suspected.

=== Main sub-types of livestock carriers ===
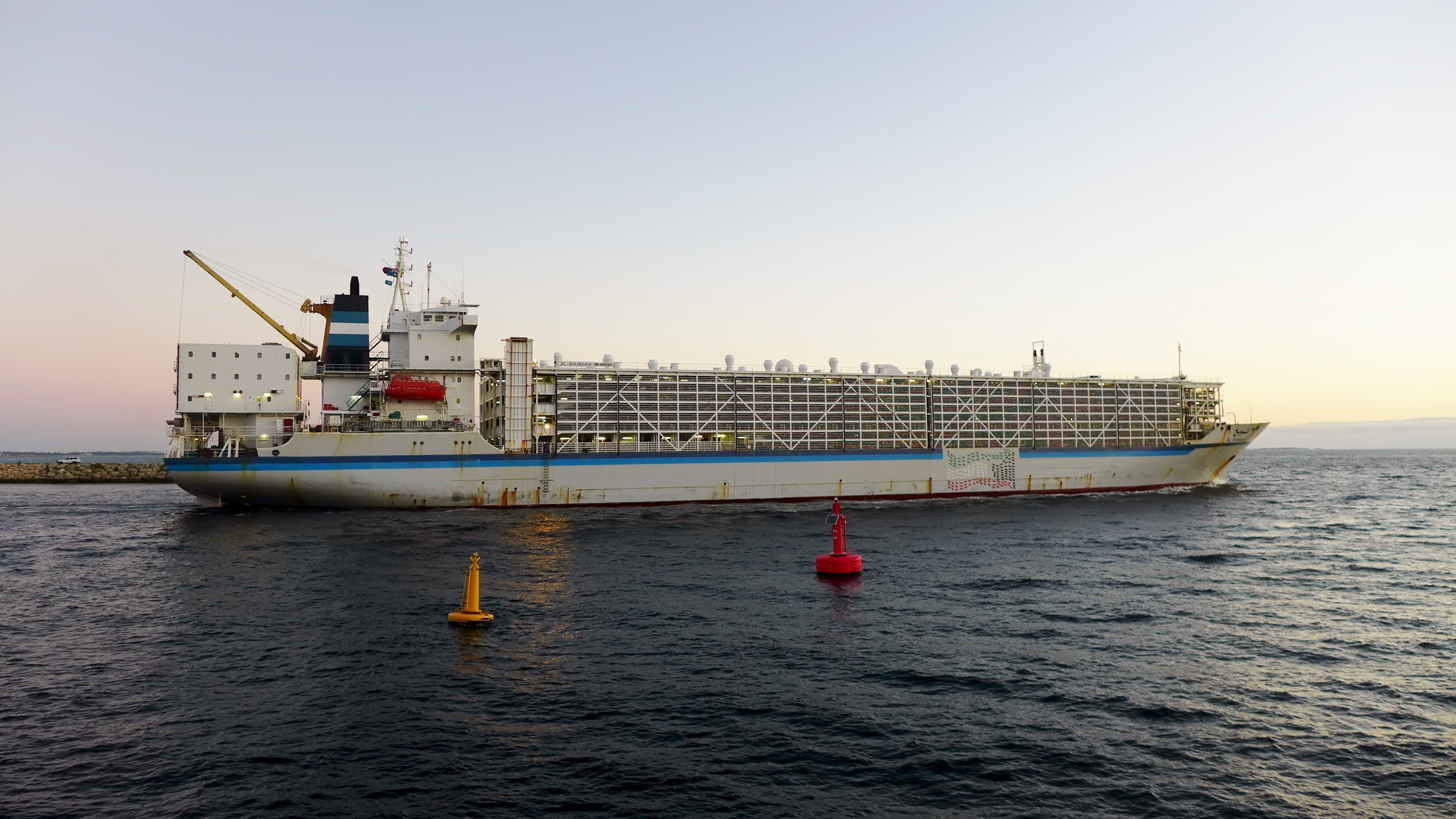
Open livestock carrier Al Shuwaikh (25,088 DWT) departing from Fremantle, 2014

- Open livestock carriers – in which all, or most, of the animal pens are installed on open decks. In theory, this provides continuous natural ventilation of the pen areas and avoids reliance on mechanical ventilation systems. Ventilation is a key factor in the transport of live animals. When animal pens become poorly ventilated, oxygen depletion and a build-up of toxic gases, develops very rapidly. Circumstances vary according to ambient conditions but a failure of ventilation systems in some tropical conditions can result in asphyxiation of animals in as little as two or three hours.

In practice, natural ventilation alone isn't adequate for all situations. One obvious limiting factor would be in following wind conditions at sea, when the air moves at the same speed as the ship. In that condition the natural air flow ventilating the animal pens can be insufficient. On most open livestock carriers there is also some type of supplementary mechanical ventilation installed in critical zones, along with appropriate back-up equipment for emergencies.

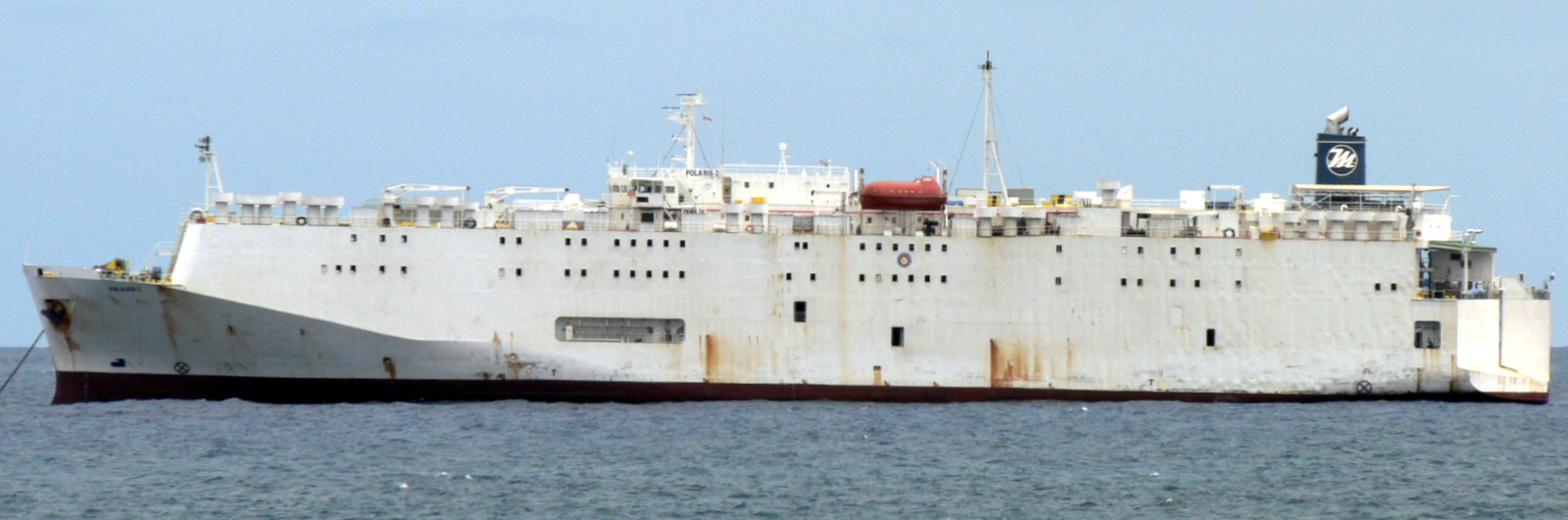
Closed livestock vessel Polaris 2 (8,443 DWT) anchoring at Las Palmas de Gran Canaria, 2013

- Closed livestock carriers – in which more or less all of the animals pens are located within the holds and internal decks of the ship. This has the advantage of providing a more controlled environment in which the animals and their feeding and watering arrangements are sheltered from adverse weather. However, ventilation is almost entirely dependent on mechanical systems and construction rules require specific ventilation standards for the internal spaces. These usually stipulate the minimum number of air changes per hour. Regulations also require back-up systems and auxiliary power arrangements which are separate from the main engine room. This is to ensure that adequate ventilation, lighting, watering and feeding can be maintained for the animals in the event of fire or machinery failure in the main engine spaces.
- Non-specialised livestock carriers – Subject to appropriate regulation, live animals may alternatively be transported as part of the cargo on various classes of ship. That particular method of transportation is more common on short sea crossings (e.g. ferries) and usually involves relatively small numbers of animals.

== Types of animals transported ==
Various species have been transported in this way, but by far the most numerous are the domesticated breeds of sheep and cattle. During the latter half of the twentieth century, millions of sheep and many thousands of cattle were transported on livestock carriers. Other domesticated species which have been transported, though in smaller numbers, include horses, camels, deer, goats and, on at least one occasion, ostriches.

The transportation of live fish, on small specialised vessels, is a similar trade which has developed in the early 21st century in association with fish farming.

== Regulation ==
National authorities, which permit the export or import of live animals, regulate and monitor the ships and the associated aspects of the trade very closely, in particular to minimise the likelihood of introducing infectious disease.

In April 2024, the livestock carrier Sarah M was banned from entry to Ireland after recently being registered with the Russian Maritime Register of Shipping. As a result of this it was subject to European Union sanctions. Subsequently it was reported to be off southern Europe, in the Mediterranean, awaiting orders.

== Sizes and capacities ==
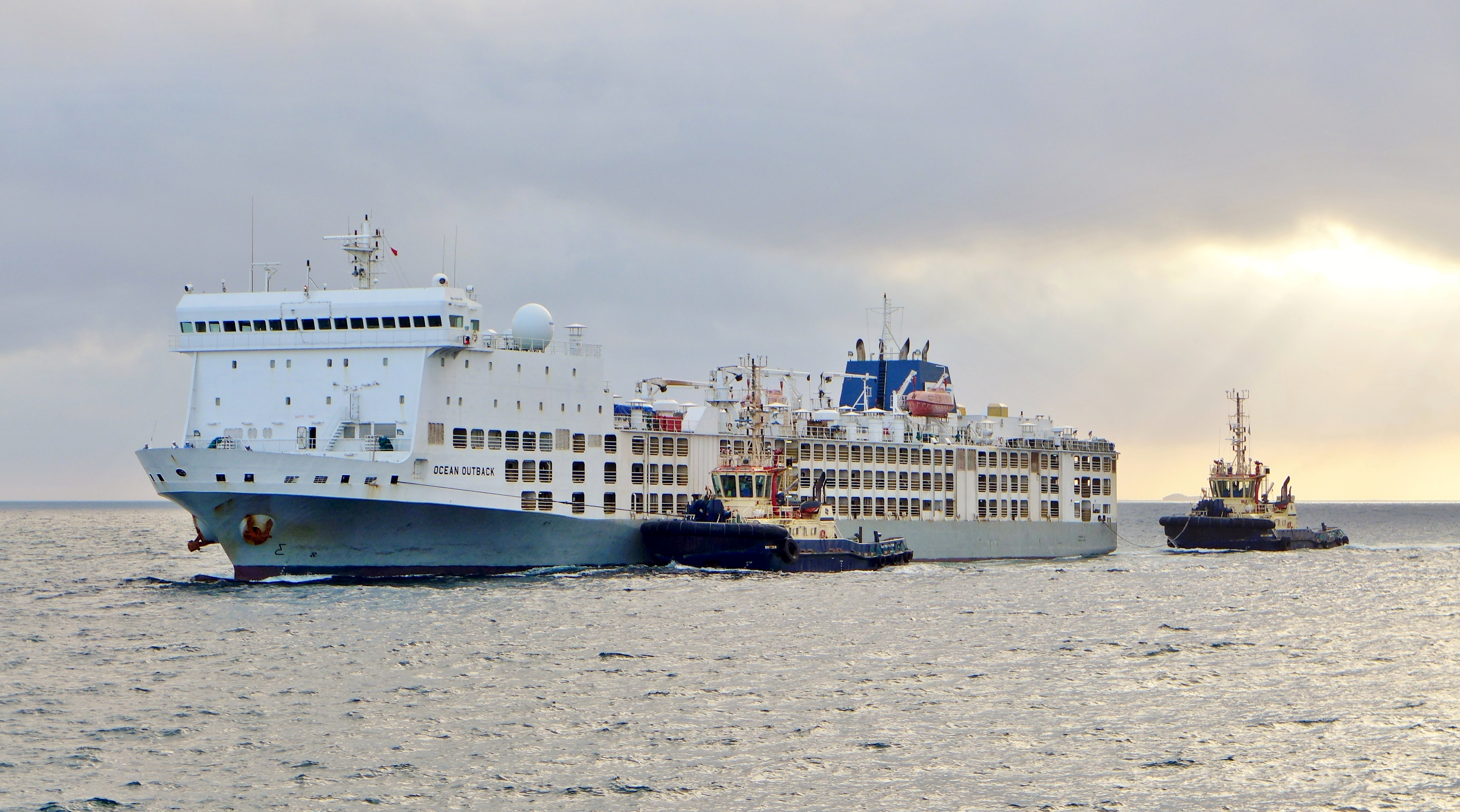
Purpose-built livestock carrier Ocean Outback (7,907 DWT) entering Fremantle, 2016

This type of ship exists in a variety of sizes, depending on market demands in different parts of the world at different times. In the latter half of the twentieth century, the prime route for such vessels was from Australasia to the Middle East. The principal livestock exporting nations were Australia and New Zealand, with the main importers being nations in the Middle East. Vessels engaged in that trade have covered a broad range of sizes, from 2,000 tonnes deadweight (DWT) to 25,000 DWT.

The limiting factors on ship size are complex. Bigger vessels can achieve economies of scale in their operations but also require more extensive port facilities to handle the larger numbers of livestock likely to be loaded or discharged.

Typically, livestock carriers carry more crew members than conventional cargo ships of a similar size, with experienced stockmen an essential part of the crew. The total number of stockmen required depends on the number of animals and also factors such as the arrangement of the livestock pens and the extent of automated systems installed for feeding and watering.

During the last three decades of the twentieth century, there was a progressive trend towards large vessels carrying greater numbers of animals in pursuit of economies of scale. Prior to that, a significant limitation had been fresh water storage capacity on ships; to maintain condition, average-sized cattle require at least forty litres of water per head, per day, with sheep requiring less- at least four litres per head, per day. Developments in water production technology (salt water evaporators or reverse-osmosis systems) have led to livestock carriers with equipment capable of producing up to 600 tonnes (600,000 litres) of fresh water per day.

Sheep and cattle also require fodder amounting to at least 2% of their body weight per day. Livestock carriers are required to carry sufficient feedstuffs for the maximum length of the voyage, as well as adequate reserves for emergencies.

Medium-sized vessels with capacity for about 30,000 to 40,000 sheep (or 3000 to 4000 head of cattle) are a common size for this type of ship. However, during the last two decades of the twentieth century, there were a small number of sheep carriers which had capacity for 130,000 sheep.

There were at least two other large livestock carriers which specialised in combined cargoes of cattle and sheep. One had capacity for about 7,000 cattle and 70,000 sheep and the other could carry 14,000 cattle and 20,000 sheep.

In 2007 the livestock carrier Deneb Prima was loading cargoes amounting to 20,000 cattle and 2000 sheep. In 2008, the Stella Deneb was reported to have loaded over 23,000 head of cattle.

The numbers detailed above are only general indications. The space allocated to animals on livestock carriers is officially regulated according to their size and weight ranges. Larger and heavier animals are allocated proportionately more space per head.

== Safety record ==
=== General assessments ===
In October 2020, livestock carriers were assessed as being twice as likely to be declared an accidental economic loss as other types of cargo vessel.

A review in February 2025 concluded that the vessels of the livestock carrier fleet remain ageing and at higher than average risk of being involved in incidents. Of the worldwide fleet of 117 livestock carriers, only 24 were built since the year 2000. Over the 10 years 2015-2024 there have been an average of more than 12 'casualty incidents' (mostly machinery damage or failure incidents) per year.

=== Specific incidents ===
The loss of the MV Uniceb in the Indian Ocean in 1996 resulted in the deaths of 67,488 sheep. This provoked animal welfare organisations including CIWF to campaign against the livestock trade.

The DANNY F II capsized in the Mediterranean Sea in December 2009 resulting in the loss of many crew members and more than 20,000 animals.

Fire broke out onboard livestock carrier Estancia (IMO 7404944) anchored off Berbera, in the Gulf of Aden, in August 2013.

In May 2015, the Asia Raya caught fire with 634 cows on board, originally destined for East Kalimantan in Indonesia; many of the cattle lost their lives.

On 12 July 2015, a livestock carrier sunk in the Gulf of Aden, with the death of all the 3,000 animals onboard and two crew.

Further livestock carrier losses in 2015 included the Haidar, in Barcarena, Brazil, in October, carrying 5,000 cattle (an unknown number drowned, and only few survived). Also in the autumn of 2015 the Nabolsi I caught fire in the Mediterranean Sea off Ierapetra, Crete while en route from Beirut (another source gives Croatia) to Alexandria.

In January 2019, the Wardeh was involved in an incident when it ran aground in the Mediterranean Sea near Mersin, Turkey. The Wardeh was out of commission at the time with no animals aboard, and dragged anchor.

On 8 July 2019, Albaraka II sank in heavy weather in the Gulf of Aden with the loss of two crew and 3,000 animals.

In November 2019, the livestock carrier Queen Hind capsized and sank in the Port of Midia, Romania, with 14,000 sheep onboard.

On 2 September 2020, some 6,000 cattle and 41 crew died during the loss of the Gulf Livestock 1 in the East China Sea. Two crew members survived.

On 12 June 2022, some 15,000 sheep drowned in the sinking of the Badr 1 in the Red Sea port of Suakin, Sudan.

2024 saw incidents involving the Al Kuwait in Cape Town, South Africa with 19,000 cattle aboard (several died and 8 were euthanised); the Bahijah, en route from Freemantle to Haifa, which was subject to a diversion forcing 8,000 sheep to endure three months aboard; and Tanzania-flagged livestock carrier Deala which ran aground (fortunately, while empty of cargo) off the eastern coast of the Istrian peninsula, Croatia and has remained stranded since.

== Controversy ==
Researchers have found various animal welfare issues from using livestock carriers. One review cited higher mortality rates, heat stress, noise, disease transmission risks between regions, ammonia rates, among others. Another study looking at live transport by sea between Australia to China found high rates of hunger and thirst, exposure to temperature swings, lack of vets, rough seas, infrastructure issues, and more.

Animal welfare and animal rights groups have criticized livestock carrier use on harms to animals. For instance, Four paws has called for their ban in the European Union. They cite a number of issues, such as heavy amounts of overcrowding, high safety risks, insufficient ventilation, lack of vets on board for injuries or sick animals, animals getting injured or falling into the water due to steep ramps at ports, and many more. Mercy for Animals has also called for them to be banned and called them a source of "extreme stress" and "physical suffering."

== See also ==
- Seagoing cowboys: WW2 relief ships
