= Gulf Livestock 1 =

Previous Cattle Carrier that sunk due to poor distribution and engine failure

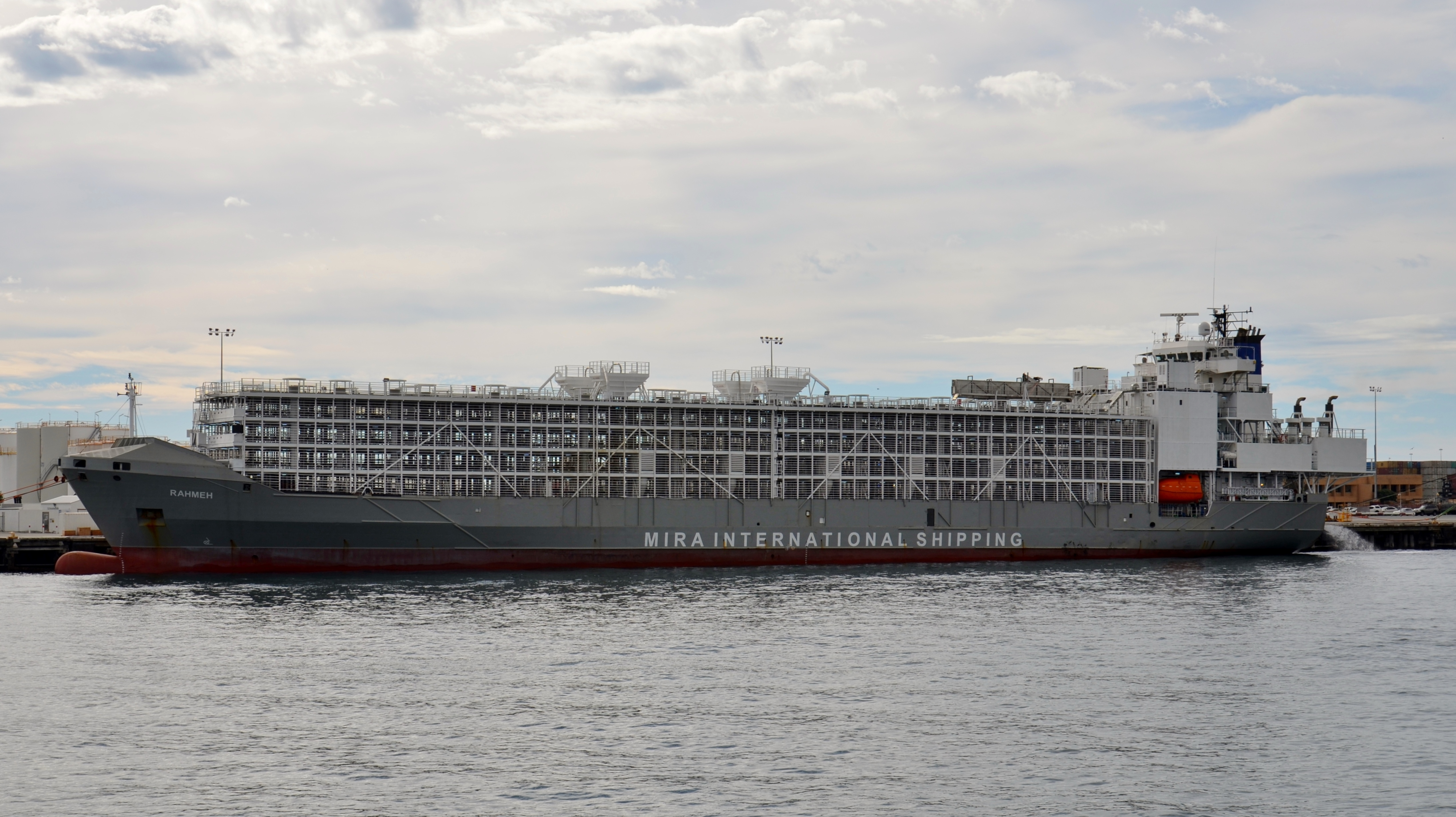
- Gulf Livestock 1 in 2016, then named Rahmeh

History
- Name: Maersk Waterford (2002–2006); Dana Hollandia (2006–2012); Cetus J. (2012–2015); Rahmeh (2015–2019); Gulf Livestock 1 (2019–2020)
- Owner: Gulf Navigation Holding
- Builder: Hegemann Rolandwerft, Berne, Germany
- Laid down: 4 April 2002
- Launched: 20 September 2002
- Completed: 9 December 2002
- In service: 9 December 2002
- Out of service: 2 September 2020
- Identification: IMO number: 9262883
- Fate: Lost at sea with 41 human lives and 5,867 cattle lost; 2 survivors, on 2 September 2020 during Typhoon Maysak

General characteristics
- Type: Container ship (2002–2015); Livestock carrier (2015–2020)
- Tonnage: 6,370 GT; 8,372 DWT
- Length: 133.6 m (438 ft 4 in)
- Beam: 19.4 m (63 ft 8 in)
- Propulsion: 1x propeller
- Speed: 18 knots (33 km/h; 21 mph)
- Crew: 43

Gulf Livestock 1 was a Panamanian-registered livestock carrier which sank 100 nautical miles (185 km) west of Amami Ōshima Island in southwest Japan on 2 September 2020 due to Typhoon Maysak.

The ship was constructed as a container ship named Maersk Waterford by the Hegemann Roland shipyard in Berne, Germany. Her keel was laid on 4 April 2002, she was launched on 20 September, and was delivered on 9 December. She was renamed Dana Hollandia in 2006, Cetus J. in 2012, and in 2015 was converted to a livestock carrier named Rahmeh. In 2019, she was renamed for the last time to Gulf Livestock 1. She had a gross tonnage of 6,370 GT and a deadweight tonnage of 8,372 DWT. She measured 133.6 metres (438 ft 4 in) long, with a beam of 19.4 metres (63 ft 8 in), and was powered by a single diesel engine that gave her a speed of 18 knots (33 km/h; 21 mph).

== Final voyage ==
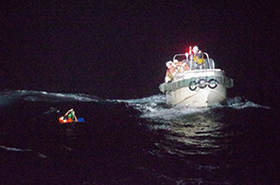
A Japanese Coast Guard rescue boat rescues a drifting crew member.

On her final voyage, Gulf Livestock 1 was carrying a cargo of 5,867 live cattle, and was owned by the UAE-based Gulf Navigation Holding shipping company. The vessel left Napier, New Zealand on 14 August, and was scheduled to arrive in the Port of Jingtang, Tangshan China on 3 September 2020.

The ship sent a distress signal from the East China Sea west of the Japanese island of Amami Ōshima on 2 September 2020 at 1:40 am JST (4:40 pm 1 September UTC). The first survivor recovered reported that the ship's sole main propulsion engine failed during rough seas caused by Typhoon Maysak, and the vessel later capsized after being struck by a wave. Before the ship capsized, the 34-year old Filipino ship captain was also able to tell his wife via instant messages that the worsening of the typhoon had caused the ship's engine to fail.

There were 43 crew members on board, 39 from the Philippines, two from New Zealand and two from Australia. The missing Australians were reported to have been an equine veterinarian and a stock handler. One of the New Zealanders was a stock handler and wilderness hunter guide named Lochie Bellerby.

On 2 September, one crew member, a 45-year-old Filipino chief officer, was rescued by the Japanese Coast Guard. On 4 September, a second crew member was found unresponsive in the water by the Coast Guard and died shortly after being rescued. In the same area, several cattle carcasses and a life vest were also recovered. A second survivor, a 30-year-old Filipino deckhand in a life raft, was rescued on the afternoon of 4 September just after 4:00 pm. On 9 September, the Coast Guard suspended the search for survivors. The tragedy led New Zealand to reconsider the exports of livestock by sea.
