= State Hydro-Meteorological Administration =

Meteorological service of North Korea

- 기상수문국
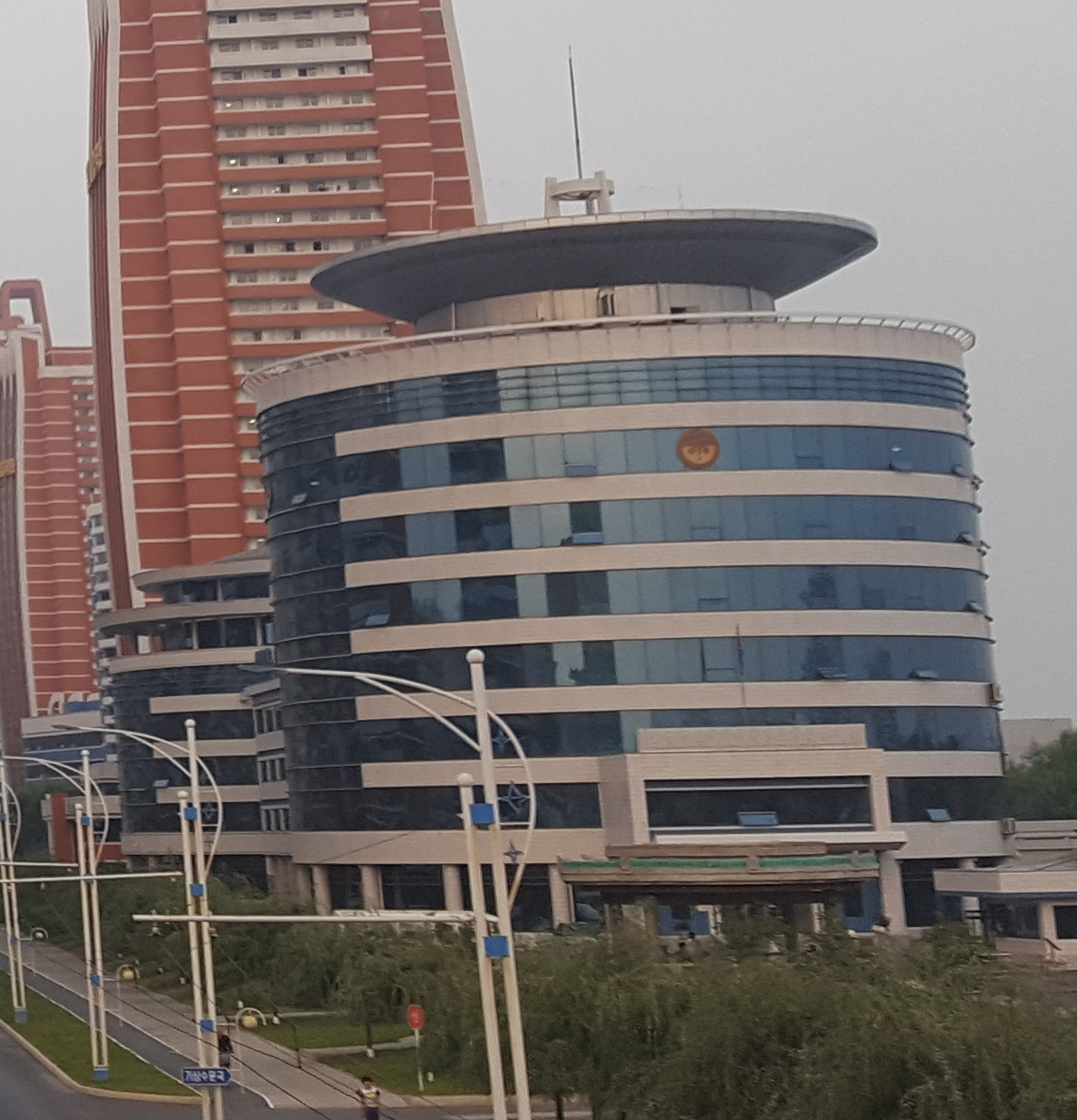
- Mirae Scientists Street, Pyongyang. The building in the foreground is the headquarters of the State Hydro-Meteorological Administration.

Agency overview
- Formed: March 1961; 65 years ago
- Superseding agency: Central Meteorological Organization
- Jurisdiction: North Korea
- Headquarters: Mirae Scientists Street, Pyongyang; 38°59′36″N 125°43′54″E
- Parent agency: Cabinet of North Korea

The State Hydro-Meteorological Administration (Korean: 기상수문국) is the National Meteorological service of the Democratic People's Republic of Korea. The service started in 1961, joining the WMO in 1975.

== History ==
Immediately after liberation, on July 10, 1946, it was founded as the Central Meteorological Organization, an organization under the Ministry of Agriculture and Forestry of the North Korean Provisional People's Committee. In September 1952, it was directly under the cabinet. It was transformed into a State Hydro-Meteorological Administration in March 1961. In May 1975, it became an official member of the World Meteorological Organization (WMO), joined the Intergovernmental Oceanography Committee in November 1978, the International Hydrology Program (IHP) in 1980, and the Antarctic Treaty in November 1987. It became an independent agency in 1995.

On 26 August 2020, Korean Central Television (KCTV) broadcast through the night, for the first time, to monitor the progress of Typhoon Bavi. This included live reports from the State Hydro-Meteorological Administration and outdoors.

== Locations ==
The headquarters is in Mirae Scientists Street, Pyongyang.

== See also ==
- Korea Meteorological Administration – The South Korean equivalent.
